

163001–163100 

|-bgcolor=#FFC2E0
| 163001 ||  || — || September 20, 2001 || Socorro || LINEAR || AMO +1kmcritical || align=right data-sort-value="0.81" | 810 m || 
|-id=002 bgcolor=#d6d6d6
| 163002 ||  || — || September 16, 2001 || Socorro || LINEAR || HYG || align=right | 5.2 km || 
|-id=003 bgcolor=#d6d6d6
| 163003 ||  || — || September 19, 2001 || Socorro || LINEAR || — || align=right | 4.8 km || 
|-id=004 bgcolor=#d6d6d6
| 163004 ||  || — || September 19, 2001 || Socorro || LINEAR || SYL7:4 || align=right | 7.3 km || 
|-id=005 bgcolor=#fefefe
| 163005 ||  || — || September 25, 2001 || Desert Eagle || W. K. Y. Yeung || — || align=right | 1.2 km || 
|-id=006 bgcolor=#d6d6d6
| 163006 ||  || — || September 24, 2001 || Socorro || LINEAR || — || align=right | 9.6 km || 
|-id=007 bgcolor=#d6d6d6
| 163007 ||  || — || September 21, 2001 || Socorro || LINEAR || — || align=right | 5.3 km || 
|-id=008 bgcolor=#d6d6d6
| 163008 ||  || — || September 16, 2001 || Socorro || LINEAR || 7:4 || align=right | 7.2 km || 
|-id=009 bgcolor=#fefefe
| 163009 ||  || — || October 14, 2001 || Socorro || LINEAR || FLO || align=right | 1.2 km || 
|-id=010 bgcolor=#d6d6d6
| 163010 ||  || — || October 14, 2001 || Desert Eagle || W. K. Y. Yeung || SYL7:4 || align=right | 6.9 km || 
|-id=011 bgcolor=#d6d6d6
| 163011 ||  || — || October 13, 2001 || Socorro || LINEAR || HYG || align=right | 5.1 km || 
|-id=012 bgcolor=#d6d6d6
| 163012 ||  || — || October 14, 2001 || Socorro || LINEAR || SYL7:4 || align=right | 7.3 km || 
|-id=013 bgcolor=#d6d6d6
| 163013 ||  || — || October 15, 2001 || Palomar || NEAT || 7:4 || align=right | 6.3 km || 
|-id=014 bgcolor=#FFC2E0
| 163014 ||  || — || October 17, 2001 || Socorro || LINEAR || APO +1kmPHA || align=right | 1.0 km || 
|-id=015 bgcolor=#FFC2E0
| 163015 ||  || — || October 21, 2001 || Palomar || NEAT || APOcritical || align=right data-sort-value="0.15" | 150 m || 
|-id=016 bgcolor=#fefefe
| 163016 ||  || — || October 17, 2001 || Socorro || LINEAR || — || align=right | 1.5 km || 
|-id=017 bgcolor=#fefefe
| 163017 ||  || — || October 20, 2001 || Socorro || LINEAR || — || align=right data-sort-value="0.85" | 850 m || 
|-id=018 bgcolor=#d6d6d6
| 163018 ||  || — || October 17, 2001 || Socorro || LINEAR || — || align=right | 6.3 km || 
|-id=019 bgcolor=#d6d6d6
| 163019 ||  || — || October 22, 2001 || Socorro || LINEAR || — || align=right | 6.2 km || 
|-id=020 bgcolor=#fefefe
| 163020 ||  || — || November 9, 2001 || Socorro || LINEAR || — || align=right | 1.3 km || 
|-id=021 bgcolor=#fefefe
| 163021 ||  || — || November 17, 2001 || Socorro || LINEAR || — || align=right | 1.4 km || 
|-id=022 bgcolor=#fefefe
| 163022 ||  || — || November 17, 2001 || Socorro || LINEAR || — || align=right | 1.2 km || 
|-id=023 bgcolor=#FFC2E0
| 163023 ||  || — || December 8, 2001 || Socorro || LINEAR || ATE || align=right data-sort-value="0.49" | 490 m || 
|-id=024 bgcolor=#fefefe
| 163024 ||  || — || December 9, 2001 || Socorro || LINEAR || V || align=right | 1.5 km || 
|-id=025 bgcolor=#fefefe
| 163025 ||  || — || December 9, 2001 || Socorro || LINEAR || FLO || align=right | 1.00 km || 
|-id=026 bgcolor=#FFC2E0
| 163026 ||  || — || December 11, 2001 || Socorro || LINEAR || APOPHAcritical || align=right data-sort-value="0.22" | 220 m || 
|-id=027 bgcolor=#fefefe
| 163027 ||  || — || December 10, 2001 || Socorro || LINEAR || FLO || align=right | 1.1 km || 
|-id=028 bgcolor=#fefefe
| 163028 ||  || — || December 11, 2001 || Socorro || LINEAR || — || align=right data-sort-value="0.93" | 930 m || 
|-id=029 bgcolor=#fefefe
| 163029 ||  || — || December 15, 2001 || Socorro || LINEAR || — || align=right | 1.1 km || 
|-id=030 bgcolor=#fefefe
| 163030 ||  || — || December 10, 2001 || Socorro || LINEAR || — || align=right | 1.1 km || 
|-id=031 bgcolor=#fefefe
| 163031 ||  || — || December 13, 2001 || Socorro || LINEAR || — || align=right | 1.9 km || 
|-id=032 bgcolor=#fefefe
| 163032 ||  || — || December 13, 2001 || Socorro || LINEAR || FLO || align=right | 1.2 km || 
|-id=033 bgcolor=#fefefe
| 163033 ||  || — || December 14, 2001 || Socorro || LINEAR || — || align=right | 1.5 km || 
|-id=034 bgcolor=#fefefe
| 163034 ||  || — || December 14, 2001 || Socorro || LINEAR || — || align=right | 1.4 km || 
|-id=035 bgcolor=#fefefe
| 163035 ||  || — || December 14, 2001 || Socorro || LINEAR || — || align=right | 1.3 km || 
|-id=036 bgcolor=#fefefe
| 163036 ||  || — || December 14, 2001 || Socorro || LINEAR || — || align=right | 1.5 km || 
|-id=037 bgcolor=#fefefe
| 163037 ||  || — || December 14, 2001 || Socorro || LINEAR || — || align=right | 1.4 km || 
|-id=038 bgcolor=#fefefe
| 163038 ||  || — || December 14, 2001 || Socorro || LINEAR || — || align=right | 1.5 km || 
|-id=039 bgcolor=#fefefe
| 163039 ||  || — || December 14, 2001 || Socorro || LINEAR || — || align=right data-sort-value="0.93" | 930 m || 
|-id=040 bgcolor=#fefefe
| 163040 ||  || — || December 14, 2001 || Socorro || LINEAR || — || align=right | 1.4 km || 
|-id=041 bgcolor=#fefefe
| 163041 ||  || — || December 11, 2001 || Socorro || LINEAR || — || align=right data-sort-value="0.90" | 900 m || 
|-id=042 bgcolor=#fefefe
| 163042 ||  || — || December 11, 2001 || Socorro || LINEAR || NYS || align=right | 3.1 km || 
|-id=043 bgcolor=#fefefe
| 163043 ||  || — || December 11, 2001 || Socorro || LINEAR || — || align=right | 1.3 km || 
|-id=044 bgcolor=#fefefe
| 163044 ||  || — || December 11, 2001 || Socorro || LINEAR || — || align=right | 1.5 km || 
|-id=045 bgcolor=#fefefe
| 163045 ||  || — || December 13, 2001 || Socorro || LINEAR || FLO || align=right data-sort-value="0.97" | 970 m || 
|-id=046 bgcolor=#fefefe
| 163046 ||  || — || December 15, 2001 || Socorro || LINEAR || — || align=right | 1.3 km || 
|-id=047 bgcolor=#fefefe
| 163047 ||  || — || December 15, 2001 || Socorro || LINEAR || — || align=right | 1.4 km || 
|-id=048 bgcolor=#fefefe
| 163048 ||  || — || December 15, 2001 || Socorro || LINEAR || — || align=right | 1.3 km || 
|-id=049 bgcolor=#fefefe
| 163049 ||  || — || December 15, 2001 || Socorro || LINEAR || — || align=right | 1.8 km || 
|-id=050 bgcolor=#fefefe
| 163050 ||  || — || December 14, 2001 || Socorro || LINEAR || — || align=right | 1.2 km || 
|-id=051 bgcolor=#FFC2E0
| 163051 ||  || — || December 22, 2001 || Haleakala || NEAT || APO +1kmPHA || align=right | 1.9 km || 
|-id=052 bgcolor=#fefefe
| 163052 ||  || — || December 17, 2001 || Socorro || LINEAR || — || align=right | 1.6 km || 
|-id=053 bgcolor=#fefefe
| 163053 ||  || — || December 17, 2001 || Socorro || LINEAR || — || align=right | 1.5 km || 
|-id=054 bgcolor=#fefefe
| 163054 ||  || — || December 17, 2001 || Socorro || LINEAR || — || align=right | 1.4 km || 
|-id=055 bgcolor=#fefefe
| 163055 ||  || — || December 18, 2001 || Socorro || LINEAR || FLO || align=right | 1.2 km || 
|-id=056 bgcolor=#fefefe
| 163056 ||  || — || December 18, 2001 || Socorro || LINEAR || — || align=right | 1.2 km || 
|-id=057 bgcolor=#fefefe
| 163057 ||  || — || December 18, 2001 || Socorro || LINEAR || — || align=right | 1.4 km || 
|-id=058 bgcolor=#fefefe
| 163058 ||  || — || December 18, 2001 || Socorro || LINEAR || — || align=right | 1.4 km || 
|-id=059 bgcolor=#fefefe
| 163059 ||  || — || December 18, 2001 || Socorro || LINEAR || — || align=right | 1.2 km || 
|-id=060 bgcolor=#fefefe
| 163060 ||  || — || December 18, 2001 || Palomar || NEAT || V || align=right | 1.1 km || 
|-id=061 bgcolor=#fefefe
| 163061 ||  || — || December 17, 2001 || Socorro || LINEAR || — || align=right data-sort-value="0.92" | 920 m || 
|-id=062 bgcolor=#fefefe
| 163062 ||  || — || December 17, 2001 || Socorro || LINEAR || — || align=right | 2.2 km || 
|-id=063 bgcolor=#fefefe
| 163063 ||  || — || December 17, 2001 || Socorro || LINEAR || V || align=right | 1.2 km || 
|-id=064 bgcolor=#fefefe
| 163064 ||  || — || December 18, 2001 || Socorro || LINEAR || — || align=right | 2.2 km || 
|-id=065 bgcolor=#fefefe
| 163065 ||  || — || December 17, 2001 || Socorro || LINEAR || — || align=right | 1.4 km || 
|-id=066 bgcolor=#fefefe
| 163066 ||  || — || December 17, 2001 || Socorro || LINEAR || EUT || align=right data-sort-value="0.96" | 960 m || 
|-id=067 bgcolor=#FFC2E0
| 163067 ||  || — || January 6, 2002 || Palomar || NEAT || APOPHAcritical || align=right data-sort-value="0.39" | 390 m || 
|-id=068 bgcolor=#fefefe
| 163068 ||  || — || January 9, 2002 || Oizumi || T. Kobayashi || FLO || align=right | 1.6 km || 
|-id=069 bgcolor=#fefefe
| 163069 ||  || — || January 5, 2002 || Kitt Peak || Spacewatch || FLO || align=right | 1.2 km || 
|-id=070 bgcolor=#FFC2E0
| 163070 ||  || — || January 8, 2002 || Socorro || LINEAR || AMO || align=right data-sort-value="0.77" | 770 m || 
|-id=071 bgcolor=#fefefe
| 163071 ||  || — || January 5, 2002 || Kitt Peak || Spacewatch || — || align=right | 1.3 km || 
|-id=072 bgcolor=#fefefe
| 163072 ||  || — || January 10, 2002 || Campo Imperatore || CINEOS || V || align=right | 1.1 km || 
|-id=073 bgcolor=#fefefe
| 163073 ||  || — || January 10, 2002 || Campo Imperatore || CINEOS || NYS || align=right data-sort-value="0.92" | 920 m || 
|-id=074 bgcolor=#fefefe
| 163074 ||  || — || January 12, 2002 || Desert Eagle || W. K. Y. Yeung || — || align=right | 2.0 km || 
|-id=075 bgcolor=#fefefe
| 163075 ||  || — || January 9, 2002 || Socorro || LINEAR || — || align=right | 1.3 km || 
|-id=076 bgcolor=#fefefe
| 163076 ||  || — || January 8, 2002 || Socorro || LINEAR || FLO || align=right | 1.2 km || 
|-id=077 bgcolor=#fefefe
| 163077 ||  || — || January 6, 2002 || Haleakala || NEAT || — || align=right | 2.1 km || 
|-id=078 bgcolor=#fefefe
| 163078 ||  || — || January 8, 2002 || Socorro || LINEAR || FLO || align=right | 1.3 km || 
|-id=079 bgcolor=#fefefe
| 163079 ||  || — || January 9, 2002 || Socorro || LINEAR || — || align=right | 1.5 km || 
|-id=080 bgcolor=#fefefe
| 163080 ||  || — || January 7, 2002 || Anderson Mesa || LONEOS || — || align=right | 1.4 km || 
|-id=081 bgcolor=#FFC2E0
| 163081 ||  || — || January 13, 2002 || Palomar || NEAT || APO || align=right data-sort-value="0.69" | 690 m || 
|-id=082 bgcolor=#fefefe
| 163082 ||  || — || January 9, 2002 || Socorro || LINEAR || — || align=right | 3.0 km || 
|-id=083 bgcolor=#fefefe
| 163083 ||  || — || January 9, 2002 || Socorro || LINEAR || — || align=right | 1.3 km || 
|-id=084 bgcolor=#fefefe
| 163084 ||  || — || January 9, 2002 || Socorro || LINEAR || V || align=right | 1.1 km || 
|-id=085 bgcolor=#fefefe
| 163085 ||  || — || January 11, 2002 || Socorro || LINEAR || — || align=right | 1.4 km || 
|-id=086 bgcolor=#fefefe
| 163086 ||  || — || January 8, 2002 || Socorro || LINEAR || — || align=right | 1.8 km || 
|-id=087 bgcolor=#fefefe
| 163087 ||  || — || January 8, 2002 || Socorro || LINEAR || NYS || align=right data-sort-value="0.97" | 970 m || 
|-id=088 bgcolor=#d6d6d6
| 163088 ||  || — || January 8, 2002 || Socorro || LINEAR || — || align=right | 6.5 km || 
|-id=089 bgcolor=#fefefe
| 163089 ||  || — || January 8, 2002 || Socorro || LINEAR || V || align=right | 1.2 km || 
|-id=090 bgcolor=#fefefe
| 163090 ||  || — || January 8, 2002 || Socorro || LINEAR || — || align=right | 1.4 km || 
|-id=091 bgcolor=#fefefe
| 163091 ||  || — || January 8, 2002 || Socorro || LINEAR || — || align=right | 3.2 km || 
|-id=092 bgcolor=#fefefe
| 163092 ||  || — || January 9, 2002 || Socorro || LINEAR || FLO || align=right | 1.1 km || 
|-id=093 bgcolor=#fefefe
| 163093 ||  || — || January 8, 2002 || Socorro || LINEAR || — || align=right | 1.5 km || 
|-id=094 bgcolor=#fefefe
| 163094 ||  || — || January 8, 2002 || Socorro || LINEAR || — || align=right | 1.7 km || 
|-id=095 bgcolor=#fefefe
| 163095 ||  || — || January 8, 2002 || Socorro || LINEAR || NYS || align=right data-sort-value="0.97" | 970 m || 
|-id=096 bgcolor=#fefefe
| 163096 ||  || — || January 9, 2002 || Socorro || LINEAR || — || align=right | 1.6 km || 
|-id=097 bgcolor=#fefefe
| 163097 ||  || — || January 9, 2002 || Socorro || LINEAR || — || align=right | 1.5 km || 
|-id=098 bgcolor=#fefefe
| 163098 ||  || — || January 9, 2002 || Socorro || LINEAR || V || align=right | 1.4 km || 
|-id=099 bgcolor=#fefefe
| 163099 ||  || — || January 9, 2002 || Socorro || LINEAR || — || align=right | 1.6 km || 
|-id=100 bgcolor=#fefefe
| 163100 ||  || — || January 9, 2002 || Socorro || LINEAR || — || align=right | 1.3 km || 
|}

163101–163200 

|-bgcolor=#fefefe
| 163101 ||  || — || January 9, 2002 || Socorro || LINEAR || — || align=right | 2.0 km || 
|-id=102 bgcolor=#C2FFFF
| 163102 ||  || — || January 11, 2002 || Socorro || LINEAR || L4 || align=right | 15 km || 
|-id=103 bgcolor=#fefefe
| 163103 ||  || — || January 13, 2002 || Socorro || LINEAR || — || align=right | 1.5 km || 
|-id=104 bgcolor=#fefefe
| 163104 ||  || — || January 13, 2002 || Socorro || LINEAR || — || align=right | 1.1 km || 
|-id=105 bgcolor=#fefefe
| 163105 ||  || — || January 9, 2002 || Socorro || LINEAR || — || align=right | 1.7 km || 
|-id=106 bgcolor=#fefefe
| 163106 ||  || — || January 13, 2002 || Socorro || LINEAR || — || align=right | 1.1 km || 
|-id=107 bgcolor=#fefefe
| 163107 ||  || — || January 13, 2002 || Socorro || LINEAR || NYS || align=right | 1.2 km || 
|-id=108 bgcolor=#fefefe
| 163108 ||  || — || January 14, 2002 || Socorro || LINEAR || FLO || align=right | 1.2 km || 
|-id=109 bgcolor=#fefefe
| 163109 ||  || — || January 13, 2002 || Socorro || LINEAR || NYS || align=right | 1.0 km || 
|-id=110 bgcolor=#fefefe
| 163110 ||  || — || January 13, 2002 || Socorro || LINEAR || — || align=right | 1.2 km || 
|-id=111 bgcolor=#fefefe
| 163111 ||  || — || January 13, 2002 || Socorro || LINEAR || V || align=right | 1.1 km || 
|-id=112 bgcolor=#fefefe
| 163112 ||  || — || January 14, 2002 || Socorro || LINEAR || FLO || align=right | 1.0 km || 
|-id=113 bgcolor=#fefefe
| 163113 ||  || — || January 14, 2002 || Socorro || LINEAR || MAS || align=right | 1.6 km || 
|-id=114 bgcolor=#fefefe
| 163114 ||  || — || January 14, 2002 || Socorro || LINEAR || — || align=right | 1.4 km || 
|-id=115 bgcolor=#fefefe
| 163115 ||  || — || January 11, 2002 || Kitt Peak || Spacewatch || — || align=right | 1.6 km || 
|-id=116 bgcolor=#fefefe
| 163116 ||  || — || January 14, 2002 || Kitt Peak || Spacewatch || — || align=right | 1.1 km || 
|-id=117 bgcolor=#fefefe
| 163117 ||  || — || January 13, 2002 || Socorro || LINEAR || — || align=right | 1.0 km || 
|-id=118 bgcolor=#fefefe
| 163118 ||  || — || January 14, 2002 || Palomar || NEAT || — || align=right | 2.0 km || 
|-id=119 bgcolor=#fefefe
| 163119 Timmckay ||  ||  || January 9, 2002 || Apache Point || SDSS || — || align=right | 1.1 km || 
|-id=120 bgcolor=#fefefe
| 163120 ||  || — || January 21, 2002 || Desert Eagle || W. K. Y. Yeung || — || align=right | 3.1 km || 
|-id=121 bgcolor=#fefefe
| 163121 ||  || — || January 18, 2002 || Socorro || LINEAR || — || align=right | 1.5 km || 
|-id=122 bgcolor=#fefefe
| 163122 ||  || — || January 19, 2002 || Socorro || LINEAR || — || align=right | 1.3 km || 
|-id=123 bgcolor=#fefefe
| 163123 ||  || — || January 19, 2002 || Socorro || LINEAR || — || align=right | 1.7 km || 
|-id=124 bgcolor=#fefefe
| 163124 ||  || — || January 21, 2002 || Socorro || LINEAR || FLO || align=right | 1.1 km || 
|-id=125 bgcolor=#fefefe
| 163125 ||  || — || January 20, 2002 || Anderson Mesa || LONEOS || V || align=right | 1.3 km || 
|-id=126 bgcolor=#fefefe
| 163126 ||  || — || January 20, 2002 || Anderson Mesa || LONEOS || FLO || align=right | 1.5 km || 
|-id=127 bgcolor=#E9E9E9
| 163127 ||  || — || January 21, 2002 || Anderson Mesa || LONEOS || — || align=right | 4.2 km || 
|-id=128 bgcolor=#fefefe
| 163128 || 2002 CN || — || February 2, 2002 || Palomar || NEAT || CHL || align=right | 3.1 km || 
|-id=129 bgcolor=#fefefe
| 163129 ||  || — || February 3, 2002 || Palomar || NEAT || FLO || align=right | 1.0 km || 
|-id=130 bgcolor=#fefefe
| 163130 ||  || — || February 4, 2002 || Palomar || NEAT || — || align=right | 3.1 km || 
|-id=131 bgcolor=#fefefe
| 163131 ||  || — || February 4, 2002 || Haleakala || NEAT || — || align=right | 1.8 km || 
|-id=132 bgcolor=#FFC2E0
| 163132 ||  || — || February 7, 2002 || Socorro || LINEAR || APOPHA || align=right data-sort-value="0.46" | 460 m || 
|-id=133 bgcolor=#fefefe
| 163133 ||  || — || February 8, 2002 || Desert Eagle || W. K. Y. Yeung || — || align=right | 1.4 km || 
|-id=134 bgcolor=#fefefe
| 163134 ||  || — || February 6, 2002 || Socorro || LINEAR || FLO || align=right | 1.1 km || 
|-id=135 bgcolor=#C2FFFF
| 163135 ||  || — || February 5, 2002 || Palomar || NEAT || L4ERY || align=right | 17 km || 
|-id=136 bgcolor=#fefefe
| 163136 ||  || — || February 6, 2002 || Socorro || LINEAR || — || align=right | 1.3 km || 
|-id=137 bgcolor=#fefefe
| 163137 ||  || — || February 6, 2002 || Socorro || LINEAR || — || align=right | 1.1 km || 
|-id=138 bgcolor=#fefefe
| 163138 ||  || — || February 7, 2002 || Socorro || LINEAR || — || align=right | 2.7 km || 
|-id=139 bgcolor=#fefefe
| 163139 ||  || — || February 11, 2002 || Desert Eagle || W. K. Y. Yeung || FLO || align=right | 1.3 km || 
|-id=140 bgcolor=#fefefe
| 163140 ||  || — || February 3, 2002 || Haleakala || NEAT || — || align=right | 1.4 km || 
|-id=141 bgcolor=#fefefe
| 163141 ||  || — || February 12, 2002 || Desert Eagle || W. K. Y. Yeung || — || align=right | 1.6 km || 
|-id=142 bgcolor=#fefefe
| 163142 ||  || — || February 12, 2002 || Desert Eagle || W. K. Y. Yeung || NYS || align=right | 1.1 km || 
|-id=143 bgcolor=#fefefe
| 163143 ||  || — || February 7, 2002 || Socorro || LINEAR || — || align=right | 1.5 km || 
|-id=144 bgcolor=#fefefe
| 163144 ||  || — || February 7, 2002 || Socorro || LINEAR || V || align=right | 2.7 km || 
|-id=145 bgcolor=#fefefe
| 163145 ||  || — || February 7, 2002 || Socorro || LINEAR || — || align=right | 1.1 km || 
|-id=146 bgcolor=#fefefe
| 163146 ||  || — || February 7, 2002 || Socorro || LINEAR || — || align=right | 1.2 km || 
|-id=147 bgcolor=#fefefe
| 163147 ||  || — || February 7, 2002 || Socorro || LINEAR || V || align=right | 1.1 km || 
|-id=148 bgcolor=#fefefe
| 163148 ||  || — || February 7, 2002 || Socorro || LINEAR || — || align=right data-sort-value="0.96" | 960 m || 
|-id=149 bgcolor=#fefefe
| 163149 ||  || — || February 7, 2002 || Socorro || LINEAR || — || align=right | 1.7 km || 
|-id=150 bgcolor=#fefefe
| 163150 ||  || — || February 7, 2002 || Socorro || LINEAR || V || align=right | 1.4 km || 
|-id=151 bgcolor=#fefefe
| 163151 ||  || — || February 7, 2002 || Socorro || LINEAR || — || align=right | 1.8 km || 
|-id=152 bgcolor=#fefefe
| 163152 ||  || — || February 7, 2002 || Socorro || LINEAR || — || align=right | 1.8 km || 
|-id=153 bgcolor=#fefefe
| 163153 Takuyaonishi ||  ||  || February 12, 2002 || Kuma Kogen || A. Nakamura || — || align=right | 3.1 km || 
|-id=154 bgcolor=#fefefe
| 163154 ||  || — || February 7, 2002 || Socorro || LINEAR || — || align=right | 2.0 km || 
|-id=155 bgcolor=#C2FFFF
| 163155 ||  || — || February 7, 2002 || Socorro || LINEAR || L4 || align=right | 14 km || 
|-id=156 bgcolor=#fefefe
| 163156 ||  || — || February 7, 2002 || Socorro || LINEAR || — || align=right | 1.2 km || 
|-id=157 bgcolor=#fefefe
| 163157 ||  || — || February 7, 2002 || Socorro || LINEAR || MAS || align=right | 1.5 km || 
|-id=158 bgcolor=#fefefe
| 163158 ||  || — || February 8, 2002 || Socorro || LINEAR || V || align=right | 1.1 km || 
|-id=159 bgcolor=#fefefe
| 163159 ||  || — || February 8, 2002 || Socorro || LINEAR || FLO || align=right | 1.1 km || 
|-id=160 bgcolor=#fefefe
| 163160 ||  || — || February 9, 2002 || Socorro || LINEAR || ERI || align=right | 3.3 km || 
|-id=161 bgcolor=#fefefe
| 163161 ||  || — || February 10, 2002 || Socorro || LINEAR || MAS || align=right | 1.8 km || 
|-id=162 bgcolor=#fefefe
| 163162 ||  || — || February 7, 2002 || Socorro || LINEAR || — || align=right | 1.5 km || 
|-id=163 bgcolor=#fefefe
| 163163 ||  || — || February 8, 2002 || Socorro || LINEAR || V || align=right | 1.1 km || 
|-id=164 bgcolor=#fefefe
| 163164 ||  || — || February 8, 2002 || Socorro || LINEAR || — || align=right | 1.5 km || 
|-id=165 bgcolor=#fefefe
| 163165 ||  || — || February 10, 2002 || Socorro || LINEAR || NYS || align=right | 1.3 km || 
|-id=166 bgcolor=#fefefe
| 163166 ||  || — || February 10, 2002 || Socorro || LINEAR || MAS || align=right | 1.1 km || 
|-id=167 bgcolor=#fefefe
| 163167 ||  || — || February 10, 2002 || Socorro || LINEAR || NYS || align=right | 1.0 km || 
|-id=168 bgcolor=#fefefe
| 163168 ||  || — || February 10, 2002 || Socorro || LINEAR || MAS || align=right | 1.1 km || 
|-id=169 bgcolor=#fefefe
| 163169 ||  || — || February 10, 2002 || Socorro || LINEAR || — || align=right | 1.2 km || 
|-id=170 bgcolor=#fefefe
| 163170 ||  || — || February 10, 2002 || Socorro || LINEAR || — || align=right | 1.8 km || 
|-id=171 bgcolor=#fefefe
| 163171 ||  || — || February 10, 2002 || Socorro || LINEAR || MAS || align=right | 1.1 km || 
|-id=172 bgcolor=#fefefe
| 163172 ||  || — || February 3, 2002 || Palomar || NEAT || FLO || align=right | 1.0 km || 
|-id=173 bgcolor=#E9E9E9
| 163173 ||  || — || February 11, 2002 || Socorro || LINEAR || — || align=right | 1.8 km || 
|-id=174 bgcolor=#fefefe
| 163174 ||  || — || February 8, 2002 || Socorro || LINEAR || PHO || align=right | 2.1 km || 
|-id=175 bgcolor=#fefefe
| 163175 ||  || — || February 11, 2002 || Socorro || LINEAR || — || align=right | 1.2 km || 
|-id=176 bgcolor=#fefefe
| 163176 ||  || — || February 11, 2002 || Socorro || LINEAR || V || align=right | 1.1 km || 
|-id=177 bgcolor=#fefefe
| 163177 ||  || — || February 11, 2002 || Socorro || LINEAR || — || align=right | 1.4 km || 
|-id=178 bgcolor=#fefefe
| 163178 ||  || — || February 15, 2002 || Socorro || LINEAR || NYS || align=right | 1.4 km || 
|-id=179 bgcolor=#fefefe
| 163179 ||  || — || February 4, 2002 || Palomar || NEAT || — || align=right | 1.4 km || 
|-id=180 bgcolor=#fefefe
| 163180 ||  || — || February 8, 2002 || Kitt Peak || Spacewatch || NYS || align=right | 2.5 km || 
|-id=181 bgcolor=#fefefe
| 163181 ||  || — || February 8, 2002 || Anderson Mesa || LONEOS || V || align=right | 1.2 km || 
|-id=182 bgcolor=#fefefe
| 163182 ||  || — || February 7, 2002 || Kitt Peak || Spacewatch || — || align=right | 2.2 km || 
|-id=183 bgcolor=#fefefe
| 163183 ||  || — || February 8, 2002 || Socorro || LINEAR || FLO || align=right | 1.3 km || 
|-id=184 bgcolor=#fefefe
| 163184 ||  || — || February 11, 2002 || Socorro || LINEAR || — || align=right | 1.6 km || 
|-id=185 bgcolor=#E9E9E9
| 163185 ||  || — || February 19, 2002 || Desert Eagle || W. K. Y. Yeung || — || align=right | 3.5 km || 
|-id=186 bgcolor=#fefefe
| 163186 ||  || — || February 24, 2002 || Palomar || NEAT || NYS || align=right | 2.0 km || 
|-id=187 bgcolor=#fefefe
| 163187 ||  || — || February 19, 2002 || Kitt Peak || Spacewatch || MAS || align=right | 1.2 km || 
|-id=188 bgcolor=#fefefe
| 163188 ||  || — || March 10, 2002 || Cima Ekar || ADAS || MAS || align=right | 1.2 km || 
|-id=189 bgcolor=#C2FFFF
| 163189 ||  || — || March 6, 2002 || Siding Spring || R. H. McNaught || L4ERY || align=right | 16 km || 
|-id=190 bgcolor=#fefefe
| 163190 ||  || — || March 12, 2002 || Črni Vrh || Črni Vrh || — || align=right | 1.7 km || 
|-id=191 bgcolor=#FFC2E0
| 163191 ||  || — || March 15, 2002 || Palomar || NEAT || APO || align=right data-sort-value="0.47" | 470 m || 
|-id=192 bgcolor=#fefefe
| 163192 ||  || — || March 13, 2002 || Črni Vrh || Črni Vrh || NYS || align=right | 1.5 km || 
|-id=193 bgcolor=#E9E9E9
| 163193 ||  || — || March 14, 2002 || Desert Eagle || W. K. Y. Yeung || — || align=right | 3.3 km || 
|-id=194 bgcolor=#E9E9E9
| 163194 ||  || — || March 5, 2002 || Palomar || NEAT || — || align=right | 1.6 km || 
|-id=195 bgcolor=#fefefe
| 163195 ||  || — || March 10, 2002 || Haleakala || NEAT || — || align=right | 1.5 km || 
|-id=196 bgcolor=#C2FFFF
| 163196 ||  || — || March 5, 2002 || Kitt Peak || Spacewatch || L4 || align=right | 16 km || 
|-id=197 bgcolor=#E9E9E9
| 163197 ||  || — || March 10, 2002 || Anderson Mesa || LONEOS || — || align=right | 1.3 km || 
|-id=198 bgcolor=#fefefe
| 163198 ||  || — || March 9, 2002 || Socorro || LINEAR || — || align=right | 1.3 km || 
|-id=199 bgcolor=#fefefe
| 163199 ||  || — || March 9, 2002 || Socorro || LINEAR || NYS || align=right data-sort-value="0.84" | 840 m || 
|-id=200 bgcolor=#fefefe
| 163200 ||  || — || March 9, 2002 || Kitt Peak || Spacewatch || — || align=right | 1.3 km || 
|}

163201–163300 

|-bgcolor=#E9E9E9
| 163201 ||  || — || March 12, 2002 || Kitt Peak || Spacewatch || — || align=right | 3.4 km || 
|-id=202 bgcolor=#fefefe
| 163202 ||  || — || March 9, 2002 || Socorro || LINEAR || — || align=right | 1.5 km || 
|-id=203 bgcolor=#fefefe
| 163203 ||  || — || March 9, 2002 || Socorro || LINEAR || — || align=right | 1.4 km || 
|-id=204 bgcolor=#fefefe
| 163204 ||  || — || March 10, 2002 || Socorro || LINEAR || — || align=right | 1.2 km || 
|-id=205 bgcolor=#fefefe
| 163205 ||  || — || March 12, 2002 || Socorro || LINEAR || — || align=right | 1.2 km || 
|-id=206 bgcolor=#fefefe
| 163206 ||  || — || March 9, 2002 || Palomar || NEAT || — || align=right | 2.3 km || 
|-id=207 bgcolor=#fefefe
| 163207 ||  || — || March 10, 2002 || Haleakala || NEAT || — || align=right | 4.0 km || 
|-id=208 bgcolor=#C2FFFF
| 163208 ||  || — || March 12, 2002 || Palomar || NEAT || L4 || align=right | 12 km || 
|-id=209 bgcolor=#E9E9E9
| 163209 ||  || — || March 12, 2002 || Palomar || NEAT || — || align=right | 1.4 km || 
|-id=210 bgcolor=#fefefe
| 163210 ||  || — || March 12, 2002 || Palomar || NEAT || NYS || align=right | 1.0 km || 
|-id=211 bgcolor=#fefefe
| 163211 ||  || — || March 12, 2002 || Palomar || NEAT || — || align=right | 1.5 km || 
|-id=212 bgcolor=#fefefe
| 163212 ||  || — || March 13, 2002 || Socorro || LINEAR || FLO || align=right data-sort-value="0.91" | 910 m || 
|-id=213 bgcolor=#fefefe
| 163213 ||  || — || March 13, 2002 || Socorro || LINEAR || — || align=right | 1.8 km || 
|-id=214 bgcolor=#fefefe
| 163214 ||  || — || March 13, 2002 || Socorro || LINEAR || — || align=right | 1.4 km || 
|-id=215 bgcolor=#fefefe
| 163215 ||  || — || March 13, 2002 || Socorro || LINEAR || NYS || align=right | 1.0 km || 
|-id=216 bgcolor=#C2FFFF
| 163216 ||  || — || March 13, 2002 || Socorro || LINEAR || L4ERY || align=right | 13 km || 
|-id=217 bgcolor=#fefefe
| 163217 ||  || — || March 13, 2002 || Socorro || LINEAR || NYS || align=right | 1.2 km || 
|-id=218 bgcolor=#fefefe
| 163218 ||  || — || March 11, 2002 || Kitt Peak || Spacewatch || — || align=right | 1.6 km || 
|-id=219 bgcolor=#fefefe
| 163219 ||  || — || March 13, 2002 || Kitt Peak || Spacewatch || NYS || align=right data-sort-value="0.84" | 840 m || 
|-id=220 bgcolor=#fefefe
| 163220 ||  || — || March 9, 2002 || Socorro || LINEAR || NYS || align=right data-sort-value="0.96" | 960 m || 
|-id=221 bgcolor=#fefefe
| 163221 ||  || — || March 9, 2002 || Socorro || LINEAR || — || align=right | 2.3 km || 
|-id=222 bgcolor=#fefefe
| 163222 ||  || — || March 9, 2002 || Socorro || LINEAR || — || align=right | 1.2 km || 
|-id=223 bgcolor=#fefefe
| 163223 ||  || — || March 12, 2002 || Socorro || LINEAR || — || align=right | 1.3 km || 
|-id=224 bgcolor=#fefefe
| 163224 ||  || — || March 9, 2002 || Kitt Peak || Spacewatch || V || align=right | 1.1 km || 
|-id=225 bgcolor=#fefefe
| 163225 ||  || — || March 9, 2002 || Kitt Peak || Spacewatch || MAS || align=right data-sort-value="0.86" | 860 m || 
|-id=226 bgcolor=#fefefe
| 163226 ||  || — || March 9, 2002 || Nogales || Tenagra II Obs. || MAS || align=right | 1.7 km || 
|-id=227 bgcolor=#E9E9E9
| 163227 ||  || — || March 9, 2002 || Anderson Mesa || LONEOS || — || align=right | 2.2 km || 
|-id=228 bgcolor=#E9E9E9
| 163228 ||  || — || March 9, 2002 || Anderson Mesa || LONEOS || — || align=right | 1.5 km || 
|-id=229 bgcolor=#fefefe
| 163229 ||  || — || March 10, 2002 || Kitt Peak || Spacewatch || V || align=right | 1.1 km || 
|-id=230 bgcolor=#fefefe
| 163230 ||  || — || March 12, 2002 || Palomar || NEAT || NYS || align=right | 1.6 km || 
|-id=231 bgcolor=#E9E9E9
| 163231 ||  || — || March 13, 2002 || Socorro || LINEAR || — || align=right | 1.5 km || 
|-id=232 bgcolor=#E9E9E9
| 163232 ||  || — || March 13, 2002 || Palomar || NEAT || RAF || align=right | 1.7 km || 
|-id=233 bgcolor=#E9E9E9
| 163233 ||  || — || March 12, 2002 || Palomar || NEAT || — || align=right | 1.6 km || 
|-id=234 bgcolor=#fefefe
| 163234 ||  || — || March 12, 2002 || Palomar || NEAT || — || align=right | 2.6 km || 
|-id=235 bgcolor=#fefefe
| 163235 ||  || — || March 15, 2002 || Palomar || NEAT || — || align=right | 1.3 km || 
|-id=236 bgcolor=#fefefe
| 163236 ||  || — || March 15, 2002 || Palomar || NEAT || MAS || align=right | 1.3 km || 
|-id=237 bgcolor=#fefefe
| 163237 ||  || — || March 15, 2002 || Kitt Peak || Spacewatch || — || align=right | 1.4 km || 
|-id=238 bgcolor=#C2FFFF
| 163238 ||  || — || March 15, 2002 || Kitt Peak || Spacewatch || L4 || align=right | 17 km || 
|-id=239 bgcolor=#fefefe
| 163239 ||  || — || March 10, 2002 || Cima Ekar || ADAS || — || align=right data-sort-value="0.84" | 840 m || 
|-id=240 bgcolor=#C2FFFF
| 163240 ||  || — || March 13, 2002 || Palomar || NEAT || L4 || align=right | 15 km || 
|-id=241 bgcolor=#fefefe
| 163241 ||  || — || March 13, 2002 || Socorro || LINEAR || NYS || align=right | 1.0 km || 
|-id=242 bgcolor=#FA8072
| 163242 || 2002 FE || — || March 16, 2002 || Haleakala || NEAT || — || align=right | 2.7 km || 
|-id=243 bgcolor=#FFC2E0
| 163243 ||  || — || March 18, 2002 || Socorro || LINEAR || ATE +1kmPHA || align=right | 1.7 km || 
|-id=244 bgcolor=#fefefe
| 163244 Matthewhill ||  ||  || March 18, 2002 || Kitt Peak || M. W. Buie || — || align=right | 1.2 km || 
|-id=245 bgcolor=#C2FFFF
| 163245 ||  || — || March 18, 2002 || Kitt Peak || Spacewatch || L4 || align=right | 17 km || 
|-id=246 bgcolor=#fefefe
| 163246 ||  || — || March 20, 2002 || Socorro || LINEAR || — || align=right | 1.4 km || 
|-id=247 bgcolor=#E9E9E9
| 163247 ||  || — || March 20, 2002 || Socorro || LINEAR || — || align=right | 1.9 km || 
|-id=248 bgcolor=#fefefe
| 163248 ||  || — || March 30, 2002 || Palomar || NEAT || — || align=right data-sort-value="0.98" | 980 m || 
|-id=249 bgcolor=#FFC2E0
| 163249 || 2002 GT || — || April 3, 2002 || Kitt Peak || Spacewatch || APOPHA || align=right data-sort-value="0.72" | 720 m || 
|-id=250 bgcolor=#FFC2E0
| 163250 ||  || — || April 4, 2002 || Socorro || LINEAR || AMO +1km || align=right | 2.8 km || 
|-id=251 bgcolor=#FA8072
| 163251 ||  || — || April 10, 2002 || Palomar || NEAT || — || align=right | 2.0 km || 
|-id=252 bgcolor=#FFC2E0
| 163252 ||  || — || April 14, 2002 || Kitt Peak || Spacewatch || AMO +1km || align=right | 1.0 km || 
|-id=253 bgcolor=#E9E9E9
| 163253 ||  || — || April 14, 2002 || Socorro || LINEAR || — || align=right | 3.0 km || 
|-id=254 bgcolor=#fefefe
| 163254 ||  || — || April 13, 2002 || Kitt Peak || Spacewatch || V || align=right | 1.2 km || 
|-id=255 bgcolor=#fefefe
| 163255 Adrianhill ||  ||  || April 6, 2002 || Cerro Tololo || M. W. Buie || NYS || align=right | 1.0 km || 
|-id=256 bgcolor=#C2FFFF
| 163256 ||  || — || April 2, 2002 || Kitt Peak || Spacewatch || L4 || align=right | 17 km || 
|-id=257 bgcolor=#fefefe
| 163257 ||  || — || April 2, 2002 || Kitt Peak || Spacewatch || V || align=right | 1.3 km || 
|-id=258 bgcolor=#E9E9E9
| 163258 ||  || — || April 3, 2002 || Socorro || LINEAR || — || align=right | 2.3 km || 
|-id=259 bgcolor=#fefefe
| 163259 ||  || — || April 4, 2002 || Palomar || NEAT || NYS || align=right | 1.1 km || 
|-id=260 bgcolor=#fefefe
| 163260 ||  || — || April 4, 2002 || Palomar || NEAT || V || align=right | 1.1 km || 
|-id=261 bgcolor=#fefefe
| 163261 ||  || — || April 4, 2002 || Palomar || NEAT || MAS || align=right | 1.3 km || 
|-id=262 bgcolor=#fefefe
| 163262 ||  || — || April 8, 2002 || Palomar || NEAT || NYS || align=right | 1.3 km || 
|-id=263 bgcolor=#C2FFFF
| 163263 ||  || — || April 9, 2002 || Palomar || NEAT || L4 || align=right | 19 km || 
|-id=264 bgcolor=#E9E9E9
| 163264 ||  || — || April 9, 2002 || Anderson Mesa || LONEOS || — || align=right | 1.8 km || 
|-id=265 bgcolor=#E9E9E9
| 163265 ||  || — || April 9, 2002 || Palomar || NEAT || — || align=right | 1.9 km || 
|-id=266 bgcolor=#fefefe
| 163266 ||  || — || April 9, 2002 || Socorro || LINEAR || NYS || align=right | 1.1 km || 
|-id=267 bgcolor=#fefefe
| 163267 ||  || — || April 9, 2002 || Anderson Mesa || LONEOS || V || align=right | 1.1 km || 
|-id=268 bgcolor=#E9E9E9
| 163268 ||  || — || April 10, 2002 || Socorro || LINEAR || — || align=right | 1.6 km || 
|-id=269 bgcolor=#E9E9E9
| 163269 ||  || — || April 10, 2002 || Socorro || LINEAR || POS || align=right | 5.5 km || 
|-id=270 bgcolor=#E9E9E9
| 163270 ||  || — || April 10, 2002 || Socorro || LINEAR || JUN || align=right | 1.6 km || 
|-id=271 bgcolor=#E9E9E9
| 163271 ||  || — || April 10, 2002 || Socorro || LINEAR || ADE || align=right | 4.5 km || 
|-id=272 bgcolor=#E9E9E9
| 163272 ||  || — || April 9, 2002 || Socorro || LINEAR || — || align=right | 2.1 km || 
|-id=273 bgcolor=#fefefe
| 163273 ||  || — || April 10, 2002 || Socorro || LINEAR || KLI || align=right | 3.2 km || 
|-id=274 bgcolor=#E9E9E9
| 163274 ||  || — || April 11, 2002 || Anderson Mesa || LONEOS || — || align=right | 2.8 km || 
|-id=275 bgcolor=#fefefe
| 163275 ||  || — || April 11, 2002 || Socorro || LINEAR || SUL || align=right | 3.7 km || 
|-id=276 bgcolor=#E9E9E9
| 163276 ||  || — || April 11, 2002 || Socorro || LINEAR || — || align=right | 2.1 km || 
|-id=277 bgcolor=#E9E9E9
| 163277 ||  || — || April 10, 2002 || Socorro || LINEAR || — || align=right | 2.6 km || 
|-id=278 bgcolor=#fefefe
| 163278 ||  || — || April 11, 2002 || Socorro || LINEAR || V || align=right | 1.4 km || 
|-id=279 bgcolor=#E9E9E9
| 163279 ||  || — || April 11, 2002 || Socorro || LINEAR || MAR || align=right | 1.6 km || 
|-id=280 bgcolor=#E9E9E9
| 163280 ||  || — || April 11, 2002 || Socorro || LINEAR || RAF || align=right | 1.3 km || 
|-id=281 bgcolor=#E9E9E9
| 163281 ||  || — || April 11, 2002 || Socorro || LINEAR || — || align=right | 1.6 km || 
|-id=282 bgcolor=#E9E9E9
| 163282 ||  || — || April 12, 2002 || Socorro || LINEAR || — || align=right | 4.2 km || 
|-id=283 bgcolor=#fefefe
| 163283 ||  || — || April 12, 2002 || Kitt Peak || Spacewatch || — || align=right | 1.2 km || 
|-id=284 bgcolor=#E9E9E9
| 163284 ||  || — || April 12, 2002 || Socorro || LINEAR || — || align=right | 1.4 km || 
|-id=285 bgcolor=#fefefe
| 163285 ||  || — || April 12, 2002 || Kitt Peak || Spacewatch || NYS || align=right | 1.0 km || 
|-id=286 bgcolor=#E9E9E9
| 163286 ||  || — || April 12, 2002 || Socorro || LINEAR || — || align=right | 1.8 km || 
|-id=287 bgcolor=#fefefe
| 163287 ||  || — || April 13, 2002 || Palomar || NEAT || — || align=right | 1.6 km || 
|-id=288 bgcolor=#E9E9E9
| 163288 ||  || — || April 13, 2002 || Palomar || NEAT || — || align=right | 1.7 km || 
|-id=289 bgcolor=#E9E9E9
| 163289 ||  || — || April 13, 2002 || Kitt Peak || Spacewatch || — || align=right | 1.8 km || 
|-id=290 bgcolor=#E9E9E9
| 163290 ||  || — || April 13, 2002 || Palomar || NEAT || — || align=right | 1.5 km || 
|-id=291 bgcolor=#fefefe
| 163291 ||  || — || April 13, 2002 || Kitt Peak || Spacewatch || V || align=right | 1.4 km || 
|-id=292 bgcolor=#fefefe
| 163292 ||  || — || April 14, 2002 || Socorro || LINEAR || V || align=right | 1.2 km || 
|-id=293 bgcolor=#E9E9E9
| 163293 ||  || — || April 12, 2002 || Palomar || NEAT || — || align=right | 2.0 km || 
|-id=294 bgcolor=#fefefe
| 163294 ||  || — || April 12, 2002 || Palomar || NEAT || — || align=right | 1.9 km || 
|-id=295 bgcolor=#FFC2E0
| 163295 || 2002 HW || — || April 16, 2002 || Socorro || LINEAR || APOcritical || align=right data-sort-value="0.49" | 490 m || 
|-id=296 bgcolor=#E9E9E9
| 163296 ||  || — || April 16, 2002 || Socorro || LINEAR || — || align=right | 2.6 km || 
|-id=297 bgcolor=#fefefe
| 163297 ||  || — || April 17, 2002 || Socorro || LINEAR || NYS || align=right | 1.3 km || 
|-id=298 bgcolor=#E9E9E9
| 163298 ||  || — || April 18, 2002 || Socorro || LINEAR || — || align=right | 2.4 km || 
|-id=299 bgcolor=#E9E9E9
| 163299 ||  || — || April 18, 2002 || Palomar || NEAT || — || align=right | 1.2 km || 
|-id=300 bgcolor=#E9E9E9
| 163300 ||  || — || May 5, 2002 || Socorro || LINEAR || BRU || align=right | 4.6 km || 
|}

163301–163400 

|-bgcolor=#fefefe
| 163301 ||  || — || May 6, 2002 || Palomar || NEAT || — || align=right | 4.2 km || 
|-id=302 bgcolor=#E9E9E9
| 163302 ||  || — || May 6, 2002 || Anderson Mesa || LONEOS || — || align=right | 3.4 km || 
|-id=303 bgcolor=#E9E9E9
| 163303 ||  || — || May 8, 2002 || Socorro || LINEAR || — || align=right | 3.9 km || 
|-id=304 bgcolor=#E9E9E9
| 163304 ||  || — || May 8, 2002 || Socorro || LINEAR || — || align=right | 2.6 km || 
|-id=305 bgcolor=#E9E9E9
| 163305 ||  || — || May 9, 2002 || Socorro || LINEAR || — || align=right | 3.5 km || 
|-id=306 bgcolor=#fefefe
| 163306 ||  || — || May 8, 2002 || Socorro || LINEAR || V || align=right | 1.1 km || 
|-id=307 bgcolor=#fefefe
| 163307 ||  || — || May 9, 2002 || Socorro || LINEAR || — || align=right | 2.3 km || 
|-id=308 bgcolor=#fefefe
| 163308 ||  || — || May 9, 2002 || Socorro || LINEAR || NYS || align=right | 1.3 km || 
|-id=309 bgcolor=#E9E9E9
| 163309 ||  || — || May 9, 2002 || Socorro || LINEAR || MAR || align=right | 2.3 km || 
|-id=310 bgcolor=#E9E9E9
| 163310 ||  || — || May 10, 2002 || Socorro || LINEAR || — || align=right | 2.9 km || 
|-id=311 bgcolor=#E9E9E9
| 163311 ||  || — || May 10, 2002 || Socorro || LINEAR || — || align=right | 2.0 km || 
|-id=312 bgcolor=#E9E9E9
| 163312 ||  || — || May 7, 2002 || Socorro || LINEAR || — || align=right | 1.8 km || 
|-id=313 bgcolor=#E9E9E9
| 163313 ||  || — || May 9, 2002 || Socorro || LINEAR || — || align=right | 2.3 km || 
|-id=314 bgcolor=#fefefe
| 163314 ||  || — || May 11, 2002 || Socorro || LINEAR || V || align=right | 1.4 km || 
|-id=315 bgcolor=#E9E9E9
| 163315 ||  || — || May 11, 2002 || Socorro || LINEAR || — || align=right | 4.1 km || 
|-id=316 bgcolor=#E9E9E9
| 163316 ||  || — || May 11, 2002 || Socorro || LINEAR || — || align=right | 1.5 km || 
|-id=317 bgcolor=#E9E9E9
| 163317 ||  || — || May 11, 2002 || Socorro || LINEAR || — || align=right | 3.2 km || 
|-id=318 bgcolor=#E9E9E9
| 163318 ||  || — || May 11, 2002 || Socorro || LINEAR || — || align=right | 3.7 km || 
|-id=319 bgcolor=#E9E9E9
| 163319 ||  || — || May 8, 2002 || Socorro || LINEAR || — || align=right | 4.3 km || 
|-id=320 bgcolor=#E9E9E9
| 163320 ||  || — || May 11, 2002 || Palomar || NEAT || RAF || align=right | 1.9 km || 
|-id=321 bgcolor=#E9E9E9
| 163321 ||  || — || May 11, 2002 || Palomar || NEAT || — || align=right | 2.0 km || 
|-id=322 bgcolor=#E9E9E9
| 163322 ||  || — || May 11, 2002 || Socorro || LINEAR || — || align=right | 3.7 km || 
|-id=323 bgcolor=#E9E9E9
| 163323 ||  || — || May 15, 2002 || Haleakala || NEAT || — || align=right | 1.4 km || 
|-id=324 bgcolor=#E9E9E9
| 163324 ||  || — || May 1, 2002 || Palomar || NEAT || RAF || align=right | 1.9 km || 
|-id=325 bgcolor=#E9E9E9
| 163325 ||  || — || May 5, 2002 || Palomar || NEAT || EUN || align=right | 1.8 km || 
|-id=326 bgcolor=#E9E9E9
| 163326 ||  || — || May 6, 2002 || Palomar || NEAT || MAR || align=right | 1.9 km || 
|-id=327 bgcolor=#FA8072
| 163327 ||  || — || May 9, 2002 || Palomar || NEAT || — || align=right | 2.4 km || 
|-id=328 bgcolor=#fefefe
| 163328 ||  || — || May 9, 2002 || Palomar || NEAT || — || align=right | 1.3 km || 
|-id=329 bgcolor=#E9E9E9
| 163329 ||  || — || May 15, 2002 || Haleakala || NEAT || — || align=right | 2.4 km || 
|-id=330 bgcolor=#fefefe
| 163330 ||  || — || May 9, 2002 || Socorro || LINEAR || V || align=right | 1.5 km || 
|-id=331 bgcolor=#fefefe
| 163331 ||  || — || May 18, 2002 || Socorro || LINEAR || — || align=right | 1.8 km || 
|-id=332 bgcolor=#E9E9E9
| 163332 ||  || — || May 18, 2002 || Socorro || LINEAR || — || align=right | 2.5 km || 
|-id=333 bgcolor=#E9E9E9
| 163333 ||  || — || May 29, 2002 || Haleakala || NEAT || — || align=right | 3.5 km || 
|-id=334 bgcolor=#E9E9E9
| 163334 ||  || — || May 16, 2002 || Socorro || LINEAR || — || align=right | 2.7 km || 
|-id=335 bgcolor=#FFC2E0
| 163335 || 2002 LJ || — || June 1, 2002 || Socorro || LINEAR || APO +1km || align=right | 1.4 km || 
|-id=336 bgcolor=#E9E9E9
| 163336 ||  || — || June 5, 2002 || Palomar || NEAT || GER || align=right | 3.1 km || 
|-id=337 bgcolor=#E9E9E9
| 163337 ||  || — || June 5, 2002 || Socorro || LINEAR || — || align=right | 1.8 km || 
|-id=338 bgcolor=#E9E9E9
| 163338 ||  || — || June 6, 2002 || Socorro || LINEAR || — || align=right | 3.3 km || 
|-id=339 bgcolor=#E9E9E9
| 163339 ||  || — || June 1, 2002 || Palomar || NEAT || — || align=right | 4.4 km || 
|-id=340 bgcolor=#E9E9E9
| 163340 ||  || — || June 9, 2002 || Socorro || LINEAR || DOR || align=right | 4.8 km || 
|-id=341 bgcolor=#E9E9E9
| 163341 ||  || — || June 11, 2002 || Fountain Hills || C. W. Juels, P. R. Holvorcem || — || align=right | 3.2 km || 
|-id=342 bgcolor=#E9E9E9
| 163342 ||  || — || June 10, 2002 || Socorro || LINEAR || — || align=right | 6.4 km || 
|-id=343 bgcolor=#E9E9E9
| 163343 ||  || — || June 8, 2002 || Socorro || LINEAR || — || align=right | 4.5 km || 
|-id=344 bgcolor=#E9E9E9
| 163344 ||  || — || June 17, 2002 || Palomar || NEAT || — || align=right | 4.0 km || 
|-id=345 bgcolor=#E9E9E9
| 163345 ||  || — || June 24, 2002 || Palomar || NEAT || AGN || align=right | 2.0 km || 
|-id=346 bgcolor=#E9E9E9
| 163346 || 2002 NS || — || July 4, 2002 || Reedy Creek || J. Broughton || DOR || align=right | 4.5 km || 
|-id=347 bgcolor=#d6d6d6
| 163347 ||  || — || July 3, 2002 || Palomar || NEAT || — || align=right | 5.1 km || 
|-id=348 bgcolor=#FFC2E0
| 163348 ||  || — || July 9, 2002 || Socorro || LINEAR || ATEPHA || align=right data-sort-value="0.74" | 740 m || 
|-id=349 bgcolor=#E9E9E9
| 163349 ||  || — || July 10, 2002 || Campo Imperatore || CINEOS || — || align=right | 4.4 km || 
|-id=350 bgcolor=#E9E9E9
| 163350 ||  || — || July 9, 2002 || Socorro || LINEAR || — || align=right | 5.0 km || 
|-id=351 bgcolor=#d6d6d6
| 163351 ||  || — || July 13, 2002 || Socorro || LINEAR || — || align=right | 6.9 km || 
|-id=352 bgcolor=#E9E9E9
| 163352 ||  || — || July 15, 2002 || Palomar || NEAT || PAD || align=right | 4.0 km || 
|-id=353 bgcolor=#d6d6d6
| 163353 ||  || — || July 15, 2002 || Palomar || NEAT || — || align=right | 4.4 km || 
|-id=354 bgcolor=#E9E9E9
| 163354 ||  || — || July 11, 2002 || Socorro || LINEAR || MAR || align=right | 1.7 km || 
|-id=355 bgcolor=#E9E9E9
| 163355 ||  || — || July 14, 2002 || Palomar || NEAT || — || align=right | 3.4 km || 
|-id=356 bgcolor=#d6d6d6
| 163356 ||  || — || July 8, 2002 || Xinglong || SCAP || BRA || align=right | 2.7 km || 
|-id=357 bgcolor=#E9E9E9
| 163357 ||  || — || July 9, 2002 || Palomar || NEAT || — || align=right | 3.2 km || 
|-id=358 bgcolor=#E9E9E9
| 163358 ||  || — || July 9, 2002 || Palomar || NEAT || — || align=right | 2.2 km || 
|-id=359 bgcolor=#E9E9E9
| 163359 ||  || — || July 17, 2002 || Palomar || NEAT || — || align=right | 1.8 km || 
|-id=360 bgcolor=#d6d6d6
| 163360 ||  || — || July 20, 2002 || Palomar || NEAT || — || align=right | 6.0 km || 
|-id=361 bgcolor=#d6d6d6
| 163361 ||  || — || July 21, 2002 || Palomar || NEAT || NAE || align=right | 5.5 km || 
|-id=362 bgcolor=#d6d6d6
| 163362 ||  || — || July 18, 2002 || Socorro || LINEAR || — || align=right | 6.4 km || 
|-id=363 bgcolor=#E9E9E9
| 163363 ||  || — || July 29, 2002 || Emerald Lane || L. Ball || — || align=right | 3.5 km || 
|-id=364 bgcolor=#FFC2E0
| 163364 ||  || — || July 21, 2002 || Palomar || NEAT || APOPHA || align=right data-sort-value="0.59" | 590 m || 
|-id=365 bgcolor=#E9E9E9
| 163365 ||  || — || July 28, 2002 || Haleakala || NEAT || GEF || align=right | 2.1 km || 
|-id=366 bgcolor=#E9E9E9
| 163366 || 2002 PM || — || August 1, 2002 || Campo Imperatore || CINEOS || — || align=right | 3.3 km || 
|-id=367 bgcolor=#E9E9E9
| 163367 || 2002 PP || — || August 2, 2002 || Campo Imperatore || CINEOS || — || align=right | 4.1 km || 
|-id=368 bgcolor=#d6d6d6
| 163368 ||  || — || August 3, 2002 || Palomar || NEAT || — || align=right | 7.8 km || 
|-id=369 bgcolor=#E9E9E9
| 163369 ||  || — || August 6, 2002 || Palomar || NEAT || — || align=right | 4.4 km || 
|-id=370 bgcolor=#E9E9E9
| 163370 ||  || — || August 6, 2002 || Palomar || NEAT || WIT || align=right | 1.7 km || 
|-id=371 bgcolor=#d6d6d6
| 163371 ||  || — || August 6, 2002 || Palomar || NEAT || TEL || align=right | 2.6 km || 
|-id=372 bgcolor=#d6d6d6
| 163372 ||  || — || August 6, 2002 || Palomar || NEAT || KAR || align=right | 2.0 km || 
|-id=373 bgcolor=#FFC2E0
| 163373 ||  || — || August 10, 2002 || Socorro || LINEAR || APOPHA || align=right data-sort-value="0.57" | 570 m || 
|-id=374 bgcolor=#d6d6d6
| 163374 ||  || — || August 5, 2002 || Socorro || LINEAR || YAK || align=right | 6.0 km || 
|-id=375 bgcolor=#d6d6d6
| 163375 ||  || — || August 10, 2002 || Socorro || LINEAR || — || align=right | 4.2 km || 
|-id=376 bgcolor=#E9E9E9
| 163376 ||  || — || August 5, 2002 || Socorro || LINEAR || PAE || align=right | 5.5 km || 
|-id=377 bgcolor=#E9E9E9
| 163377 ||  || — || August 8, 2002 || Palomar || NEAT || GEF || align=right | 2.9 km || 
|-id=378 bgcolor=#d6d6d6
| 163378 ||  || — || August 11, 2002 || Palomar || NEAT || — || align=right | 4.6 km || 
|-id=379 bgcolor=#d6d6d6
| 163379 ||  || — || August 10, 2002 || Socorro || LINEAR || KOR || align=right | 2.5 km || 
|-id=380 bgcolor=#E9E9E9
| 163380 ||  || — || August 13, 2002 || Vicques || M. Ory || DOR || align=right | 5.0 km || 
|-id=381 bgcolor=#E9E9E9
| 163381 ||  || — || August 12, 2002 || Socorro || LINEAR || GEF || align=right | 5.3 km || 
|-id=382 bgcolor=#d6d6d6
| 163382 ||  || — || August 14, 2002 || Anderson Mesa || LONEOS || — || align=right | 4.7 km || 
|-id=383 bgcolor=#E9E9E9
| 163383 ||  || — || August 13, 2002 || Anderson Mesa || LONEOS || — || align=right | 4.0 km || 
|-id=384 bgcolor=#E9E9E9
| 163384 ||  || — || August 14, 2002 || Socorro || LINEAR || — || align=right | 3.9 km || 
|-id=385 bgcolor=#E9E9E9
| 163385 ||  || — || August 14, 2002 || Socorro || LINEAR || — || align=right | 3.2 km || 
|-id=386 bgcolor=#d6d6d6
| 163386 ||  || — || August 11, 2002 || Palomar || S. F. Hönig || KOR || align=right | 1.6 km || 
|-id=387 bgcolor=#E9E9E9
| 163387 ||  || — || August 7, 2002 || Palomar || NEAT || — || align=right | 3.8 km || 
|-id=388 bgcolor=#d6d6d6
| 163388 ||  || — || August 16, 2002 || Socorro || LINEAR || — || align=right | 6.0 km || 
|-id=389 bgcolor=#d6d6d6
| 163389 ||  || — || August 16, 2002 || Haleakala || NEAT || — || align=right | 4.8 km || 
|-id=390 bgcolor=#d6d6d6
| 163390 ||  || — || August 16, 2002 || Haleakala || NEAT || EOS || align=right | 4.5 km || 
|-id=391 bgcolor=#E9E9E9
| 163391 ||  || — || August 26, 2002 || Palomar || NEAT || GEF || align=right | 2.5 km || 
|-id=392 bgcolor=#d6d6d6
| 163392 ||  || — || August 29, 2002 || Palomar || NEAT || — || align=right | 3.2 km || 
|-id=393 bgcolor=#d6d6d6
| 163393 ||  || — || August 29, 2002 || Palomar || NEAT || — || align=right | 5.1 km || 
|-id=394 bgcolor=#d6d6d6
| 163394 ||  || — || August 30, 2002 || Kitt Peak || Spacewatch || — || align=right | 4.5 km || 
|-id=395 bgcolor=#E9E9E9
| 163395 ||  || — || August 30, 2002 || Palomar || NEAT || — || align=right | 4.8 km || 
|-id=396 bgcolor=#E9E9E9
| 163396 ||  || — || August 30, 2002 || Palomar || NEAT || — || align=right | 4.2 km || 
|-id=397 bgcolor=#d6d6d6
| 163397 ||  || — || August 20, 2002 || Palomar || R. Matson || — || align=right | 5.7 km || 
|-id=398 bgcolor=#d6d6d6
| 163398 ||  || — || August 29, 2002 || Palomar || S. F. Hönig || EOS || align=right | 2.6 km || 
|-id=399 bgcolor=#d6d6d6
| 163399 ||  || — || August 28, 2002 || Palomar || NEAT || KOR || align=right | 2.0 km || 
|-id=400 bgcolor=#E9E9E9
| 163400 ||  || — || August 18, 2002 || Palomar || NEAT || — || align=right | 3.3 km || 
|}

163401–163500 

|-bgcolor=#E9E9E9
| 163401 ||  || — || August 17, 2002 || Palomar || NEAT || AGN || align=right | 1.8 km || 
|-id=402 bgcolor=#E9E9E9
| 163402 ||  || — || August 17, 2002 || Palomar || NEAT || HEN || align=right | 1.9 km || 
|-id=403 bgcolor=#d6d6d6
| 163403 ||  || — || August 17, 2002 || Palomar || NEAT || CHA || align=right | 2.5 km || 
|-id=404 bgcolor=#E9E9E9
| 163404 ||  || — || August 19, 2002 || Palomar || NEAT || GEF || align=right | 2.4 km || 
|-id=405 bgcolor=#d6d6d6
| 163405 ||  || — || August 24, 2002 || Palomar || NEAT || EOS || align=right | 4.0 km || 
|-id=406 bgcolor=#E9E9E9
| 163406 ||  || — || September 4, 2002 || Anderson Mesa || LONEOS || DOR || align=right | 5.7 km || 
|-id=407 bgcolor=#d6d6d6
| 163407 ||  || — || September 3, 2002 || Palomar || NEAT || — || align=right | 7.4 km || 
|-id=408 bgcolor=#d6d6d6
| 163408 ||  || — || September 2, 2002 || Kitt Peak || Spacewatch || KOR || align=right | 2.7 km || 
|-id=409 bgcolor=#d6d6d6
| 163409 ||  || — || September 4, 2002 || Anderson Mesa || LONEOS || — || align=right | 4.9 km || 
|-id=410 bgcolor=#d6d6d6
| 163410 ||  || — || September 4, 2002 || Anderson Mesa || LONEOS || — || align=right | 5.1 km || 
|-id=411 bgcolor=#d6d6d6
| 163411 ||  || — || September 4, 2002 || Anderson Mesa || LONEOS || EOS || align=right | 3.8 km || 
|-id=412 bgcolor=#FFC2E0
| 163412 ||  || — || September 5, 2002 || Socorro || LINEAR || AMO +1km || align=right | 1.3 km || 
|-id=413 bgcolor=#E9E9E9
| 163413 ||  || — || September 2, 2002 || Haleakala || NEAT || GEF || align=right | 1.9 km || 
|-id=414 bgcolor=#d6d6d6
| 163414 ||  || — || September 4, 2002 || Palomar || NEAT || NAE || align=right | 6.0 km || 
|-id=415 bgcolor=#d6d6d6
| 163415 ||  || — || September 4, 2002 || Anderson Mesa || LONEOS || — || align=right | 3.9 km || 
|-id=416 bgcolor=#d6d6d6
| 163416 ||  || — || September 5, 2002 || Anderson Mesa || LONEOS || — || align=right | 4.9 km || 
|-id=417 bgcolor=#E9E9E9
| 163417 ||  || — || September 5, 2002 || Socorro || LINEAR || AGN || align=right | 3.9 km || 
|-id=418 bgcolor=#d6d6d6
| 163418 ||  || — || September 5, 2002 || Socorro || LINEAR || — || align=right | 4.9 km || 
|-id=419 bgcolor=#d6d6d6
| 163419 ||  || — || September 5, 2002 || Socorro || LINEAR || — || align=right | 6.1 km || 
|-id=420 bgcolor=#d6d6d6
| 163420 ||  || — || September 5, 2002 || Socorro || LINEAR || KOR || align=right | 3.0 km || 
|-id=421 bgcolor=#d6d6d6
| 163421 ||  || — || September 5, 2002 || Anderson Mesa || LONEOS || — || align=right | 4.7 km || 
|-id=422 bgcolor=#d6d6d6
| 163422 ||  || — || September 5, 2002 || Anderson Mesa || LONEOS || TEL || align=right | 2.8 km || 
|-id=423 bgcolor=#d6d6d6
| 163423 ||  || — || September 5, 2002 || Anderson Mesa || LONEOS || — || align=right | 4.1 km || 
|-id=424 bgcolor=#d6d6d6
| 163424 ||  || — || September 5, 2002 || Anderson Mesa || LONEOS || — || align=right | 3.9 km || 
|-id=425 bgcolor=#FA8072
| 163425 ||  || — || September 5, 2002 || Socorro || LINEAR || H || align=right data-sort-value="0.93" | 930 m || 
|-id=426 bgcolor=#E9E9E9
| 163426 ||  || — || September 5, 2002 || Socorro || LINEAR || — || align=right | 5.8 km || 
|-id=427 bgcolor=#d6d6d6
| 163427 ||  || — || September 5, 2002 || Socorro || LINEAR || — || align=right | 5.9 km || 
|-id=428 bgcolor=#d6d6d6
| 163428 ||  || — || September 5, 2002 || Socorro || LINEAR || — || align=right | 5.5 km || 
|-id=429 bgcolor=#d6d6d6
| 163429 ||  || — || September 5, 2002 || Socorro || LINEAR || — || align=right | 5.9 km || 
|-id=430 bgcolor=#d6d6d6
| 163430 ||  || — || September 3, 2002 || Palomar || NEAT || — || align=right | 7.7 km || 
|-id=431 bgcolor=#d6d6d6
| 163431 ||  || — || September 3, 2002 || Palomar || NEAT || — || align=right | 5.2 km || 
|-id=432 bgcolor=#d6d6d6
| 163432 ||  || — || September 4, 2002 || Anderson Mesa || LONEOS || — || align=right | 5.7 km || 
|-id=433 bgcolor=#d6d6d6
| 163433 ||  || — || September 4, 2002 || Palomar || NEAT || NAE || align=right | 6.1 km || 
|-id=434 bgcolor=#d6d6d6
| 163434 ||  || — || September 5, 2002 || Socorro || LINEAR || — || align=right | 4.7 km || 
|-id=435 bgcolor=#d6d6d6
| 163435 ||  || — || September 5, 2002 || Socorro || LINEAR || — || align=right | 3.9 km || 
|-id=436 bgcolor=#d6d6d6
| 163436 ||  || — || September 5, 2002 || Socorro || LINEAR || — || align=right | 4.4 km || 
|-id=437 bgcolor=#d6d6d6
| 163437 ||  || — || September 5, 2002 || Socorro || LINEAR || — || align=right | 4.5 km || 
|-id=438 bgcolor=#d6d6d6
| 163438 ||  || — || September 5, 2002 || Socorro || LINEAR || — || align=right | 3.3 km || 
|-id=439 bgcolor=#d6d6d6
| 163439 ||  || — || September 5, 2002 || Socorro || LINEAR || — || align=right | 4.3 km || 
|-id=440 bgcolor=#d6d6d6
| 163440 ||  || — || September 5, 2002 || Socorro || LINEAR || HYG || align=right | 6.5 km || 
|-id=441 bgcolor=#d6d6d6
| 163441 ||  || — || September 5, 2002 || Anderson Mesa || LONEOS || — || align=right | 5.2 km || 
|-id=442 bgcolor=#d6d6d6
| 163442 ||  || — || September 5, 2002 || Socorro || LINEAR || — || align=right | 4.9 km || 
|-id=443 bgcolor=#d6d6d6
| 163443 ||  || — || September 5, 2002 || Socorro || LINEAR || — || align=right | 5.7 km || 
|-id=444 bgcolor=#d6d6d6
| 163444 ||  || — || September 5, 2002 || Socorro || LINEAR || — || align=right | 5.4 km || 
|-id=445 bgcolor=#d6d6d6
| 163445 ||  || — || September 5, 2002 || Socorro || LINEAR || — || align=right | 5.6 km || 
|-id=446 bgcolor=#d6d6d6
| 163446 ||  || — || September 5, 2002 || Socorro || LINEAR || — || align=right | 4.7 km || 
|-id=447 bgcolor=#d6d6d6
| 163447 ||  || — || September 5, 2002 || Socorro || LINEAR || — || align=right | 6.2 km || 
|-id=448 bgcolor=#d6d6d6
| 163448 ||  || — || September 5, 2002 || Socorro || LINEAR || — || align=right | 5.1 km || 
|-id=449 bgcolor=#d6d6d6
| 163449 ||  || — || September 6, 2002 || Socorro || LINEAR || — || align=right | 5.4 km || 
|-id=450 bgcolor=#d6d6d6
| 163450 ||  || — || September 8, 2002 || Haleakala || NEAT || EOS || align=right | 3.8 km || 
|-id=451 bgcolor=#d6d6d6
| 163451 ||  || — || September 8, 2002 || Haleakala || NEAT || — || align=right | 5.3 km || 
|-id=452 bgcolor=#d6d6d6
| 163452 ||  || — || September 9, 2002 || Palomar || NEAT || — || align=right | 5.8 km || 
|-id=453 bgcolor=#E9E9E9
| 163453 ||  || — || September 10, 2002 || Palomar || NEAT || — || align=right | 4.5 km || 
|-id=454 bgcolor=#FFC2E0
| 163454 ||  || — || September 11, 2002 || Palomar || NEAT || APO || align=right data-sort-value="0.71" | 710 m || 
|-id=455 bgcolor=#d6d6d6
| 163455 ||  || — || September 11, 2002 || Palomar || NEAT || — || align=right | 5.9 km || 
|-id=456 bgcolor=#E9E9E9
| 163456 ||  || — || September 10, 2002 || Palomar || NEAT || — || align=right | 5.2 km || 
|-id=457 bgcolor=#d6d6d6
| 163457 ||  || — || September 10, 2002 || Palomar || NEAT || EOS || align=right | 3.3 km || 
|-id=458 bgcolor=#d6d6d6
| 163458 ||  || — || September 10, 2002 || Palomar || NEAT || — || align=right | 3.4 km || 
|-id=459 bgcolor=#d6d6d6
| 163459 ||  || — || September 10, 2002 || Palomar || NEAT || EOS || align=right | 4.2 km || 
|-id=460 bgcolor=#d6d6d6
| 163460 ||  || — || September 10, 2002 || Palomar || NEAT || — || align=right | 5.7 km || 
|-id=461 bgcolor=#d6d6d6
| 163461 ||  || — || September 11, 2002 || Palomar || NEAT || — || align=right | 3.6 km || 
|-id=462 bgcolor=#d6d6d6
| 163462 ||  || — || September 11, 2002 || Palomar || NEAT || — || align=right | 3.6 km || 
|-id=463 bgcolor=#d6d6d6
| 163463 ||  || — || September 12, 2002 || Palomar || NEAT || — || align=right | 4.3 km || 
|-id=464 bgcolor=#d6d6d6
| 163464 ||  || — || September 13, 2002 || Palomar || NEAT || — || align=right | 4.8 km || 
|-id=465 bgcolor=#d6d6d6
| 163465 ||  || — || September 13, 2002 || Palomar || NEAT || EOS || align=right | 3.4 km || 
|-id=466 bgcolor=#d6d6d6
| 163466 ||  || — || September 13, 2002 || Palomar || NEAT || — || align=right | 3.6 km || 
|-id=467 bgcolor=#d6d6d6
| 163467 ||  || — || September 13, 2002 || Palomar || NEAT || — || align=right | 5.8 km || 
|-id=468 bgcolor=#d6d6d6
| 163468 ||  || — || September 13, 2002 || Palomar || NEAT || — || align=right | 7.2 km || 
|-id=469 bgcolor=#d6d6d6
| 163469 ||  || — || September 14, 2002 || Kitt Peak || Spacewatch || — || align=right | 3.7 km || 
|-id=470 bgcolor=#d6d6d6
| 163470 Kenwallis ||  ||  || September 14, 2002 || Michael Adrian || M. Kretlow || — || align=right | 3.5 km || 
|-id=471 bgcolor=#d6d6d6
| 163471 ||  || — || September 12, 2002 || Palomar || NEAT || EOS || align=right | 3.3 km || 
|-id=472 bgcolor=#E9E9E9
| 163472 ||  || — || September 12, 2002 || Palomar || NEAT || CLO || align=right | 4.8 km || 
|-id=473 bgcolor=#d6d6d6
| 163473 ||  || — || September 14, 2002 || Palomar || NEAT || 628 || align=right | 2.8 km || 
|-id=474 bgcolor=#d6d6d6
| 163474 ||  || — || September 15, 2002 || Palomar || NEAT || 7:4 || align=right | 8.3 km || 
|-id=475 bgcolor=#d6d6d6
| 163475 ||  || — || September 15, 2002 || Haleakala || NEAT || EOS || align=right | 4.0 km || 
|-id=476 bgcolor=#d6d6d6
| 163476 ||  || — || September 14, 2002 || Haleakala || NEAT || — || align=right | 5.6 km || 
|-id=477 bgcolor=#d6d6d6
| 163477 ||  || — || September 15, 2002 || Haleakala || NEAT || EOS || align=right | 3.6 km || 
|-id=478 bgcolor=#d6d6d6
| 163478 ||  || — || September 13, 2002 || Haleakala || NEAT || — || align=right | 4.9 km || 
|-id=479 bgcolor=#d6d6d6
| 163479 ||  || — || September 14, 2002 || Haleakala || NEAT || TEL || align=right | 2.0 km || 
|-id=480 bgcolor=#d6d6d6
| 163480 ||  || — || September 15, 2002 || Haleakala || NEAT || — || align=right | 5.0 km || 
|-id=481 bgcolor=#d6d6d6
| 163481 ||  || — || September 1, 2002 || Haleakala || R. Matson || — || align=right | 4.8 km || 
|-id=482 bgcolor=#d6d6d6
| 163482 ||  || — || September 15, 2002 || Palomar || R. Matson || — || align=right | 4.4 km || 
|-id=483 bgcolor=#d6d6d6
| 163483 ||  || — || September 4, 2002 || Palomar || NEAT || KAR || align=right | 1.5 km || 
|-id=484 bgcolor=#d6d6d6
| 163484 ||  || — || September 27, 2002 || Palomar || NEAT || — || align=right | 7.5 km || 
|-id=485 bgcolor=#d6d6d6
| 163485 ||  || — || September 27, 2002 || Palomar || NEAT || — || align=right | 3.9 km || 
|-id=486 bgcolor=#d6d6d6
| 163486 ||  || — || September 27, 2002 || Palomar || NEAT || — || align=right | 5.5 km || 
|-id=487 bgcolor=#d6d6d6
| 163487 ||  || — || September 27, 2002 || Palomar || NEAT || URS || align=right | 7.5 km || 
|-id=488 bgcolor=#d6d6d6
| 163488 ||  || — || September 27, 2002 || Palomar || NEAT || — || align=right | 3.7 km || 
|-id=489 bgcolor=#d6d6d6
| 163489 ||  || — || September 27, 2002 || Palomar || NEAT || — || align=right | 4.8 km || 
|-id=490 bgcolor=#d6d6d6
| 163490 ||  || — || September 27, 2002 || Palomar || NEAT || HYG || align=right | 5.5 km || 
|-id=491 bgcolor=#E9E9E9
| 163491 ||  || — || September 27, 2002 || Anderson Mesa || LONEOS || — || align=right | 3.4 km || 
|-id=492 bgcolor=#d6d6d6
| 163492 ||  || — || September 28, 2002 || Haleakala || NEAT || — || align=right | 6.8 km || 
|-id=493 bgcolor=#d6d6d6
| 163493 ||  || — || September 28, 2002 || Haleakala || NEAT || EOS || align=right | 4.0 km || 
|-id=494 bgcolor=#d6d6d6
| 163494 ||  || — || September 28, 2002 || Haleakala || NEAT || — || align=right | 3.7 km || 
|-id=495 bgcolor=#d6d6d6
| 163495 ||  || — || September 28, 2002 || Haleakala || NEAT || — || align=right | 5.4 km || 
|-id=496 bgcolor=#d6d6d6
| 163496 ||  || — || September 30, 2002 || Socorro || LINEAR || — || align=right | 4.7 km || 
|-id=497 bgcolor=#E9E9E9
| 163497 ||  || — || September 30, 2002 || Haleakala || NEAT || — || align=right | 5.0 km || 
|-id=498 bgcolor=#d6d6d6
| 163498 ||  || — || September 30, 2002 || Haleakala || NEAT || — || align=right | 4.9 km || 
|-id=499 bgcolor=#d6d6d6
| 163499 ||  || — || September 30, 2002 || Haleakala || NEAT || — || align=right | 5.9 km || 
|-id=500 bgcolor=#d6d6d6
| 163500 ||  || — || September 28, 2002 || Haleakala || NEAT || EOS || align=right | 3.8 km || 
|}

163501–163600 

|-bgcolor=#d6d6d6
| 163501 ||  || — || September 29, 2002 || Kitt Peak || Spacewatch || — || align=right | 4.5 km || 
|-id=502 bgcolor=#d6d6d6
| 163502 ||  || — || September 29, 2002 || Haleakala || NEAT || — || align=right | 3.9 km || 
|-id=503 bgcolor=#d6d6d6
| 163503 ||  || — || September 29, 2002 || Haleakala || NEAT || — || align=right | 7.7 km || 
|-id=504 bgcolor=#d6d6d6
| 163504 ||  || — || September 30, 2002 || Socorro || LINEAR || EOS || align=right | 3.9 km || 
|-id=505 bgcolor=#d6d6d6
| 163505 ||  || — || September 30, 2002 || Socorro || LINEAR || — || align=right | 4.5 km || 
|-id=506 bgcolor=#d6d6d6
| 163506 ||  || — || September 30, 2002 || Socorro || LINEAR || — || align=right | 4.9 km || 
|-id=507 bgcolor=#d6d6d6
| 163507 ||  || — || September 30, 2002 || Socorro || LINEAR || — || align=right | 5.7 km || 
|-id=508 bgcolor=#d6d6d6
| 163508 ||  || — || September 16, 2002 || Haleakala || NEAT || — || align=right | 5.7 km || 
|-id=509 bgcolor=#d6d6d6
| 163509 ||  || — || September 16, 2002 || Palomar || NEAT || — || align=right | 5.3 km || 
|-id=510 bgcolor=#d6d6d6
| 163510 || 2002 TR || — || October 1, 2002 || Anderson Mesa || LONEOS || — || align=right | 4.6 km || 
|-id=511 bgcolor=#d6d6d6
| 163511 ||  || — || October 1, 2002 || Anderson Mesa || LONEOS || KOR || align=right | 2.2 km || 
|-id=512 bgcolor=#d6d6d6
| 163512 ||  || — || October 1, 2002 || Anderson Mesa || LONEOS || — || align=right | 5.9 km || 
|-id=513 bgcolor=#d6d6d6
| 163513 ||  || — || October 1, 2002 || Anderson Mesa || LONEOS || — || align=right | 3.5 km || 
|-id=514 bgcolor=#d6d6d6
| 163514 ||  || — || October 1, 2002 || Anderson Mesa || LONEOS || — || align=right | 4.4 km || 
|-id=515 bgcolor=#d6d6d6
| 163515 ||  || — || October 1, 2002 || Socorro || LINEAR || HYG || align=right | 4.7 km || 
|-id=516 bgcolor=#d6d6d6
| 163516 ||  || — || October 1, 2002 || Socorro || LINEAR || — || align=right | 5.0 km || 
|-id=517 bgcolor=#d6d6d6
| 163517 ||  || — || October 1, 2002 || Socorro || LINEAR || — || align=right | 5.4 km || 
|-id=518 bgcolor=#d6d6d6
| 163518 ||  || — || October 2, 2002 || Socorro || LINEAR || — || align=right | 4.2 km || 
|-id=519 bgcolor=#d6d6d6
| 163519 ||  || — || October 2, 2002 || Socorro || LINEAR || KOR || align=right | 3.4 km || 
|-id=520 bgcolor=#d6d6d6
| 163520 ||  || — || October 2, 2002 || Socorro || LINEAR || HYG || align=right | 5.8 km || 
|-id=521 bgcolor=#E9E9E9
| 163521 ||  || — || October 2, 2002 || Socorro || LINEAR || HEN || align=right | 1.8 km || 
|-id=522 bgcolor=#d6d6d6
| 163522 ||  || — || October 2, 2002 || Socorro || LINEAR || — || align=right | 4.3 km || 
|-id=523 bgcolor=#d6d6d6
| 163523 ||  || — || October 2, 2002 || Socorro || LINEAR || KOR || align=right | 2.9 km || 
|-id=524 bgcolor=#d6d6d6
| 163524 ||  || — || October 2, 2002 || Socorro || LINEAR || — || align=right | 3.6 km || 
|-id=525 bgcolor=#d6d6d6
| 163525 ||  || — || October 2, 2002 || Socorro || LINEAR || — || align=right | 8.9 km || 
|-id=526 bgcolor=#d6d6d6
| 163526 ||  || — || October 2, 2002 || Socorro || LINEAR || — || align=right | 5.2 km || 
|-id=527 bgcolor=#d6d6d6
| 163527 ||  || — || October 2, 2002 || Socorro || LINEAR || — || align=right | 7.8 km || 
|-id=528 bgcolor=#d6d6d6
| 163528 ||  || — || October 2, 2002 || Socorro || LINEAR || THM || align=right | 5.0 km || 
|-id=529 bgcolor=#d6d6d6
| 163529 ||  || — || October 2, 2002 || Socorro || LINEAR || EOS || align=right | 3.4 km || 
|-id=530 bgcolor=#d6d6d6
| 163530 ||  || — || October 2, 2002 || Socorro || LINEAR || HYG || align=right | 5.7 km || 
|-id=531 bgcolor=#d6d6d6
| 163531 ||  || — || October 2, 2002 || Socorro || LINEAR || — || align=right | 5.7 km || 
|-id=532 bgcolor=#d6d6d6
| 163532 ||  || — || October 2, 2002 || Socorro || LINEAR || EOS || align=right | 3.9 km || 
|-id=533 bgcolor=#d6d6d6
| 163533 ||  || — || October 2, 2002 || Socorro || LINEAR || — || align=right | 8.2 km || 
|-id=534 bgcolor=#d6d6d6
| 163534 ||  || — || October 2, 2002 || Socorro || LINEAR || TIR || align=right | 5.7 km || 
|-id=535 bgcolor=#d6d6d6
| 163535 ||  || — || October 2, 2002 || Haleakala || NEAT || — || align=right | 2.9 km || 
|-id=536 bgcolor=#d6d6d6
| 163536 ||  || — || October 2, 2002 || Haleakala || NEAT || — || align=right | 5.6 km || 
|-id=537 bgcolor=#d6d6d6
| 163537 ||  || — || October 2, 2002 || Haleakala || NEAT || — || align=right | 6.0 km || 
|-id=538 bgcolor=#d6d6d6
| 163538 ||  || — || October 7, 2002 || Palomar || NEAT || Tj (2.99) || align=right | 4.6 km || 
|-id=539 bgcolor=#d6d6d6
| 163539 ||  || — || October 4, 2002 || Palomar || NEAT || EOS || align=right | 3.3 km || 
|-id=540 bgcolor=#E9E9E9
| 163540 ||  || — || October 1, 2002 || Anderson Mesa || LONEOS || — || align=right | 4.7 km || 
|-id=541 bgcolor=#d6d6d6
| 163541 ||  || — || October 1, 2002 || Anderson Mesa || LONEOS || EOS || align=right | 4.1 km || 
|-id=542 bgcolor=#d6d6d6
| 163542 ||  || — || October 2, 2002 || Haleakala || NEAT || MEL || align=right | 6.3 km || 
|-id=543 bgcolor=#d6d6d6
| 163543 ||  || — || October 2, 2002 || Haleakala || NEAT || — || align=right | 5.8 km || 
|-id=544 bgcolor=#d6d6d6
| 163544 ||  || — || October 2, 2002 || Haleakala || NEAT || — || align=right | 5.7 km || 
|-id=545 bgcolor=#d6d6d6
| 163545 ||  || — || October 3, 2002 || Palomar || NEAT || EMA || align=right | 6.6 km || 
|-id=546 bgcolor=#d6d6d6
| 163546 ||  || — || October 3, 2002 || Palomar || NEAT || EOS || align=right | 3.6 km || 
|-id=547 bgcolor=#d6d6d6
| 163547 ||  || — || October 3, 2002 || Socorro || LINEAR || — || align=right | 4.5 km || 
|-id=548 bgcolor=#d6d6d6
| 163548 ||  || — || October 3, 2002 || Socorro || LINEAR || — || align=right | 3.8 km || 
|-id=549 bgcolor=#d6d6d6
| 163549 ||  || — || October 3, 2002 || Socorro || LINEAR || — || align=right | 3.4 km || 
|-id=550 bgcolor=#d6d6d6
| 163550 ||  || — || October 4, 2002 || Socorro || LINEAR || EOS || align=right | 4.1 km || 
|-id=551 bgcolor=#d6d6d6
| 163551 ||  || — || October 3, 2002 || Socorro || LINEAR || HYG || align=right | 4.2 km || 
|-id=552 bgcolor=#d6d6d6
| 163552 ||  || — || October 2, 2002 || Haleakala || NEAT || — || align=right | 5.3 km || 
|-id=553 bgcolor=#d6d6d6
| 163553 ||  || — || October 3, 2002 || Palomar || NEAT || EOS || align=right | 5.9 km || 
|-id=554 bgcolor=#d6d6d6
| 163554 ||  || — || October 3, 2002 || Palomar || NEAT || — || align=right | 7.2 km || 
|-id=555 bgcolor=#d6d6d6
| 163555 ||  || — || October 3, 2002 || Palomar || NEAT || EOS || align=right | 3.6 km || 
|-id=556 bgcolor=#d6d6d6
| 163556 ||  || — || October 3, 2002 || Palomar || NEAT || — || align=right | 4.0 km || 
|-id=557 bgcolor=#d6d6d6
| 163557 ||  || — || October 3, 2002 || Palomar || NEAT || — || align=right | 6.5 km || 
|-id=558 bgcolor=#d6d6d6
| 163558 ||  || — || October 4, 2002 || Palomar || NEAT || — || align=right | 7.7 km || 
|-id=559 bgcolor=#d6d6d6
| 163559 ||  || — || October 4, 2002 || Palomar || NEAT || — || align=right | 4.6 km || 
|-id=560 bgcolor=#d6d6d6
| 163560 ||  || — || October 4, 2002 || Palomar || NEAT || — || align=right | 5.1 km || 
|-id=561 bgcolor=#d6d6d6
| 163561 ||  || — || October 4, 2002 || Palomar || NEAT || — || align=right | 6.0 km || 
|-id=562 bgcolor=#d6d6d6
| 163562 ||  || — || October 4, 2002 || Palomar || NEAT || — || align=right | 6.3 km || 
|-id=563 bgcolor=#d6d6d6
| 163563 ||  || — || October 4, 2002 || Palomar || NEAT || EOS || align=right | 6.8 km || 
|-id=564 bgcolor=#d6d6d6
| 163564 ||  || — || October 4, 2002 || Palomar || NEAT || — || align=right | 4.8 km || 
|-id=565 bgcolor=#d6d6d6
| 163565 ||  || — || October 4, 2002 || Socorro || LINEAR || — || align=right | 4.5 km || 
|-id=566 bgcolor=#d6d6d6
| 163566 ||  || — || October 4, 2002 || Palomar || NEAT || — || align=right | 3.6 km || 
|-id=567 bgcolor=#d6d6d6
| 163567 ||  || — || October 4, 2002 || Anderson Mesa || LONEOS || EOS || align=right | 4.8 km || 
|-id=568 bgcolor=#d6d6d6
| 163568 ||  || — || October 4, 2002 || Anderson Mesa || LONEOS || — || align=right | 4.7 km || 
|-id=569 bgcolor=#d6d6d6
| 163569 ||  || — || October 4, 2002 || Socorro || LINEAR || — || align=right | 5.5 km || 
|-id=570 bgcolor=#d6d6d6
| 163570 ||  || — || October 4, 2002 || Socorro || LINEAR || — || align=right | 4.2 km || 
|-id=571 bgcolor=#d6d6d6
| 163571 ||  || — || October 4, 2002 || Socorro || LINEAR || — || align=right | 4.8 km || 
|-id=572 bgcolor=#d6d6d6
| 163572 ||  || — || October 5, 2002 || Palomar || NEAT || EOS || align=right | 3.9 km || 
|-id=573 bgcolor=#d6d6d6
| 163573 ||  || — || October 5, 2002 || Palomar || NEAT || — || align=right | 6.7 km || 
|-id=574 bgcolor=#d6d6d6
| 163574 ||  || — || October 5, 2002 || Palomar || NEAT || — || align=right | 5.4 km || 
|-id=575 bgcolor=#d6d6d6
| 163575 ||  || — || October 5, 2002 || Palomar || NEAT || — || align=right | 5.5 km || 
|-id=576 bgcolor=#d6d6d6
| 163576 ||  || — || October 5, 2002 || Palomar || NEAT || TIR || align=right | 4.6 km || 
|-id=577 bgcolor=#d6d6d6
| 163577 ||  || — || October 3, 2002 || Palomar || NEAT || — || align=right | 4.2 km || 
|-id=578 bgcolor=#d6d6d6
| 163578 ||  || — || October 4, 2002 || Socorro || LINEAR || TEL || align=right | 2.9 km || 
|-id=579 bgcolor=#d6d6d6
| 163579 ||  || — || October 4, 2002 || Socorro || LINEAR || ALA || align=right | 7.2 km || 
|-id=580 bgcolor=#d6d6d6
| 163580 ||  || — || October 14, 2002 || Socorro || LINEAR || TIR || align=right | 5.3 km || 
|-id=581 bgcolor=#E9E9E9
| 163581 ||  || — || October 4, 2002 || Socorro || LINEAR || DOR || align=right | 7.0 km || 
|-id=582 bgcolor=#d6d6d6
| 163582 ||  || — || October 4, 2002 || Socorro || LINEAR || EOS || align=right | 3.2 km || 
|-id=583 bgcolor=#d6d6d6
| 163583 ||  || — || October 4, 2002 || Socorro || LINEAR || — || align=right | 6.8 km || 
|-id=584 bgcolor=#d6d6d6
| 163584 ||  || — || October 4, 2002 || Palomar || NEAT || EOS || align=right | 3.0 km || 
|-id=585 bgcolor=#d6d6d6
| 163585 ||  || — || October 4, 2002 || Socorro || LINEAR || — || align=right | 5.4 km || 
|-id=586 bgcolor=#d6d6d6
| 163586 ||  || — || October 5, 2002 || Socorro || LINEAR || — || align=right | 5.5 km || 
|-id=587 bgcolor=#d6d6d6
| 163587 ||  || — || October 1, 2002 || Socorro || LINEAR || — || align=right | 7.4 km || 
|-id=588 bgcolor=#d6d6d6
| 163588 ||  || — || October 5, 2002 || Anderson Mesa || LONEOS || — || align=right | 3.9 km || 
|-id=589 bgcolor=#d6d6d6
| 163589 ||  || — || October 5, 2002 || Anderson Mesa || LONEOS || — || align=right | 4.6 km || 
|-id=590 bgcolor=#d6d6d6
| 163590 ||  || — || October 5, 2002 || Anderson Mesa || LONEOS || URS || align=right | 7.8 km || 
|-id=591 bgcolor=#d6d6d6
| 163591 ||  || — || October 4, 2002 || Socorro || LINEAR || — || align=right | 4.6 km || 
|-id=592 bgcolor=#d6d6d6
| 163592 ||  || — || October 4, 2002 || Socorro || LINEAR || — || align=right | 5.4 km || 
|-id=593 bgcolor=#d6d6d6
| 163593 ||  || — || October 4, 2002 || Socorro || LINEAR || — || align=right | 6.0 km || 
|-id=594 bgcolor=#d6d6d6
| 163594 ||  || — || October 4, 2002 || Socorro || LINEAR || slow || align=right | 4.0 km || 
|-id=595 bgcolor=#d6d6d6
| 163595 ||  || — || October 6, 2002 || Socorro || LINEAR || EOS || align=right | 2.9 km || 
|-id=596 bgcolor=#d6d6d6
| 163596 ||  || — || October 4, 2002 || Socorro || LINEAR || — || align=right | 4.6 km || 
|-id=597 bgcolor=#d6d6d6
| 163597 ||  || — || October 8, 2002 || Anderson Mesa || LONEOS || ALA || align=right | 7.2 km || 
|-id=598 bgcolor=#d6d6d6
| 163598 ||  || — || October 7, 2002 || Palomar || NEAT || — || align=right | 3.9 km || 
|-id=599 bgcolor=#d6d6d6
| 163599 ||  || — || October 6, 2002 || Socorro || LINEAR || — || align=right | 8.7 km || 
|-id=600 bgcolor=#d6d6d6
| 163600 ||  || — || October 7, 2002 || Anderson Mesa || LONEOS || EOS || align=right | 4.7 km || 
|}

163601–163700 

|-bgcolor=#d6d6d6
| 163601 ||  || — || October 7, 2002 || Anderson Mesa || LONEOS || TRP || align=right | 4.5 km || 
|-id=602 bgcolor=#d6d6d6
| 163602 ||  || — || October 7, 2002 || Socorro || LINEAR || — || align=right | 5.0 km || 
|-id=603 bgcolor=#d6d6d6
| 163603 ||  || — || October 9, 2002 || Anderson Mesa || LONEOS || — || align=right | 4.9 km || 
|-id=604 bgcolor=#d6d6d6
| 163604 ||  || — || October 9, 2002 || Anderson Mesa || LONEOS || EOS || align=right | 3.6 km || 
|-id=605 bgcolor=#d6d6d6
| 163605 ||  || — || October 9, 2002 || Kitt Peak || Spacewatch || — || align=right | 3.6 km || 
|-id=606 bgcolor=#d6d6d6
| 163606 ||  || — || October 9, 2002 || Socorro || LINEAR || — || align=right | 5.2 km || 
|-id=607 bgcolor=#d6d6d6
| 163607 ||  || — || October 9, 2002 || Socorro || LINEAR || — || align=right | 5.3 km || 
|-id=608 bgcolor=#d6d6d6
| 163608 ||  || — || October 9, 2002 || Socorro || LINEAR || — || align=right | 4.3 km || 
|-id=609 bgcolor=#d6d6d6
| 163609 ||  || — || October 9, 2002 || Socorro || LINEAR || HYG || align=right | 3.9 km || 
|-id=610 bgcolor=#d6d6d6
| 163610 ||  || — || October 9, 2002 || Socorro || LINEAR || — || align=right | 8.2 km || 
|-id=611 bgcolor=#d6d6d6
| 163611 ||  || — || October 10, 2002 || Socorro || LINEAR || EOS || align=right | 3.6 km || 
|-id=612 bgcolor=#d6d6d6
| 163612 ||  || — || October 9, 2002 || Socorro || LINEAR || HYG || align=right | 4.9 km || 
|-id=613 bgcolor=#d6d6d6
| 163613 ||  || — || October 10, 2002 || Socorro || LINEAR || — || align=right | 7.3 km || 
|-id=614 bgcolor=#d6d6d6
| 163614 ||  || — || October 10, 2002 || Socorro || LINEAR || — || align=right | 6.1 km || 
|-id=615 bgcolor=#d6d6d6
| 163615 ||  || — || October 10, 2002 || Socorro || LINEAR || — || align=right | 5.2 km || 
|-id=616 bgcolor=#d6d6d6
| 163616 ||  || — || October 10, 2002 || Socorro || LINEAR || — || align=right | 6.5 km || 
|-id=617 bgcolor=#d6d6d6
| 163617 ||  || — || October 10, 2002 || Socorro || LINEAR || HYG || align=right | 5.6 km || 
|-id=618 bgcolor=#d6d6d6
| 163618 ||  || — || October 10, 2002 || Socorro || LINEAR || — || align=right | 8.2 km || 
|-id=619 bgcolor=#d6d6d6
| 163619 ||  || — || October 10, 2002 || Socorro || LINEAR || — || align=right | 6.5 km || 
|-id=620 bgcolor=#d6d6d6
| 163620 ||  || — || October 10, 2002 || Socorro || LINEAR || — || align=right | 8.0 km || 
|-id=621 bgcolor=#d6d6d6
| 163621 ||  || — || October 12, 2002 || Socorro || LINEAR || EOS || align=right | 5.6 km || 
|-id=622 bgcolor=#d6d6d6
| 163622 ||  || — || October 15, 2002 || Palomar || NEAT || — || align=right | 5.3 km || 
|-id=623 bgcolor=#d6d6d6
| 163623 Miknaitis ||  ||  || October 5, 2002 || Apache Point || SDSS || — || align=right | 6.8 km || 
|-id=624 bgcolor=#d6d6d6
| 163624 Moorthy ||  ||  || October 10, 2002 || Apache Point || SDSS || — || align=right | 4.7 km || 
|-id=625 bgcolor=#d6d6d6
| 163625 Munn ||  ||  || October 10, 2002 || Apache Point || SDSS || — || align=right | 5.5 km || 
|-id=626 bgcolor=#d6d6d6
| 163626 Glatfelter || 2002 UV ||  || October 27, 2002 || Wrightwood || J. W. Young || THM || align=right | 5.0 km || 
|-id=627 bgcolor=#d6d6d6
| 163627 ||  || — || October 28, 2002 || Palomar || NEAT || — || align=right | 6.3 km || 
|-id=628 bgcolor=#d6d6d6
| 163628 ||  || — || October 28, 2002 || Palomar || NEAT || — || align=right | 4.8 km || 
|-id=629 bgcolor=#d6d6d6
| 163629 ||  || — || October 26, 2002 || Haleakala || NEAT || — || align=right | 4.5 km || 
|-id=630 bgcolor=#d6d6d6
| 163630 ||  || — || October 29, 2002 || Nogales || Tenagra II Obs. || — || align=right | 4.1 km || 
|-id=631 bgcolor=#d6d6d6
| 163631 ||  || — || October 28, 2002 || Haleakala || NEAT || EOS || align=right | 4.0 km || 
|-id=632 bgcolor=#d6d6d6
| 163632 ||  || — || October 30, 2002 || Palomar || NEAT || — || align=right | 7.0 km || 
|-id=633 bgcolor=#d6d6d6
| 163633 ||  || — || October 30, 2002 || Palomar || NEAT || VER || align=right | 7.0 km || 
|-id=634 bgcolor=#d6d6d6
| 163634 ||  || — || October 30, 2002 || Haleakala || NEAT || VER || align=right | 4.9 km || 
|-id=635 bgcolor=#d6d6d6
| 163635 ||  || — || October 31, 2002 || Socorro || LINEAR || — || align=right | 4.9 km || 
|-id=636 bgcolor=#d6d6d6
| 163636 ||  || — || October 30, 2002 || Palomar || NEAT || — || align=right | 5.2 km || 
|-id=637 bgcolor=#d6d6d6
| 163637 ||  || — || October 31, 2002 || Palomar || NEAT || THM || align=right | 6.1 km || 
|-id=638 bgcolor=#d6d6d6
| 163638 ||  || — || October 31, 2002 || Kvistaberg || UDAS || K-2 || align=right | 2.4 km || 
|-id=639 bgcolor=#d6d6d6
| 163639 Tomnash ||  ||  || October 29, 2002 || Apache Point || SDSS || — || align=right | 5.9 km || 
|-id=640 bgcolor=#d6d6d6
| 163640 Newberg ||  ||  || October 29, 2002 || Apache Point || SDSS || — || align=right | 3.7 km || 
|-id=641 bgcolor=#d6d6d6
| 163641 Nichol ||  ||  || October 30, 2002 || Apache Point || SDSS || EOS || align=right | 2.4 km || 
|-id=642 bgcolor=#d6d6d6
| 163642 ||  || — || October 29, 2002 || Palomar || NEAT || EOS || align=right | 3.8 km || 
|-id=643 bgcolor=#d6d6d6
| 163643 ||  || — || November 1, 2002 || Socorro || LINEAR || THM || align=right | 3.4 km || 
|-id=644 bgcolor=#d6d6d6
| 163644 ||  || — || November 1, 2002 || Palomar || NEAT || HYG || align=right | 4.0 km || 
|-id=645 bgcolor=#d6d6d6
| 163645 ||  || — || November 1, 2002 || Palomar || NEAT || — || align=right | 5.5 km || 
|-id=646 bgcolor=#d6d6d6
| 163646 ||  || — || November 4, 2002 || Anderson Mesa || LONEOS || — || align=right | 4.0 km || 
|-id=647 bgcolor=#d6d6d6
| 163647 ||  || — || November 5, 2002 || Kitt Peak || Spacewatch || BRA || align=right | 2.4 km || 
|-id=648 bgcolor=#d6d6d6
| 163648 ||  || — || November 5, 2002 || Socorro || LINEAR || HYG || align=right | 5.2 km || 
|-id=649 bgcolor=#d6d6d6
| 163649 ||  || — || November 5, 2002 || Anderson Mesa || LONEOS || — || align=right | 3.8 km || 
|-id=650 bgcolor=#d6d6d6
| 163650 ||  || — || November 5, 2002 || Socorro || LINEAR || — || align=right | 6.1 km || 
|-id=651 bgcolor=#d6d6d6
| 163651 ||  || — || November 5, 2002 || Palomar || NEAT || — || align=right | 5.9 km || 
|-id=652 bgcolor=#d6d6d6
| 163652 ||  || — || November 7, 2002 || Socorro || LINEAR || — || align=right | 5.6 km || 
|-id=653 bgcolor=#d6d6d6
| 163653 ||  || — || November 7, 2002 || Socorro || LINEAR || HYG || align=right | 5.1 km || 
|-id=654 bgcolor=#d6d6d6
| 163654 ||  || — || November 7, 2002 || Socorro || LINEAR || — || align=right | 5.4 km || 
|-id=655 bgcolor=#d6d6d6
| 163655 ||  || — || November 7, 2002 || Socorro || LINEAR || — || align=right | 5.0 km || 
|-id=656 bgcolor=#d6d6d6
| 163656 ||  || — || November 11, 2002 || Socorro || LINEAR || — || align=right | 9.2 km || 
|-id=657 bgcolor=#d6d6d6
| 163657 ||  || — || November 8, 2002 || Socorro || LINEAR || — || align=right | 4.8 km || 
|-id=658 bgcolor=#d6d6d6
| 163658 ||  || — || November 8, 2002 || Socorro || LINEAR || HYG || align=right | 3.9 km || 
|-id=659 bgcolor=#E9E9E9
| 163659 ||  || — || November 13, 2002 || Kitt Peak || Spacewatch || HEN || align=right | 1.4 km || 
|-id=660 bgcolor=#d6d6d6
| 163660 ||  || — || November 13, 2002 || Palomar || NEAT || — || align=right | 6.9 km || 
|-id=661 bgcolor=#d6d6d6
| 163661 ||  || — || November 12, 2002 || Palomar || NEAT || EOS || align=right | 4.7 km || 
|-id=662 bgcolor=#d6d6d6
| 163662 ||  || — || November 12, 2002 || Palomar || NEAT || — || align=right | 6.5 km || 
|-id=663 bgcolor=#d6d6d6
| 163663 ||  || — || November 13, 2002 || Palomar || NEAT || — || align=right | 5.4 km || 
|-id=664 bgcolor=#d6d6d6
| 163664 ||  || — || November 13, 2002 || Palomar || NEAT || — || align=right | 5.0 km || 
|-id=665 bgcolor=#d6d6d6
| 163665 ||  || — || November 13, 2002 || Palomar || S. F. Hönig || — || align=right | 3.2 km || 
|-id=666 bgcolor=#fefefe
| 163666 || 2002 WD || — || November 16, 2002 || Socorro || LINEAR || H || align=right | 1.1 km || 
|-id=667 bgcolor=#FFC2E0
| 163667 ||  || — || November 22, 2002 || Palomar || NEAT || AMOcritical || align=right data-sort-value="0.41" | 410 m || 
|-id=668 bgcolor=#d6d6d6
| 163668 ||  || — || November 24, 2002 || Palomar || NEAT || — || align=right | 4.2 km || 
|-id=669 bgcolor=#d6d6d6
| 163669 ||  || — || November 24, 2002 || Palomar || NEAT || — || align=right | 4.4 km || 
|-id=670 bgcolor=#d6d6d6
| 163670 ||  || — || November 27, 2002 || Anderson Mesa || LONEOS || — || align=right | 5.5 km || 
|-id=671 bgcolor=#d6d6d6
| 163671 ||  || — || November 30, 2002 || Socorro || LINEAR || — || align=right | 5.6 km || 
|-id=672 bgcolor=#d6d6d6
| 163672 ||  || — || December 2, 2002 || Socorro || LINEAR || — || align=right | 4.9 km || 
|-id=673 bgcolor=#d6d6d6
| 163673 ||  || — || December 2, 2002 || Socorro || LINEAR || — || align=right | 5.5 km || 
|-id=674 bgcolor=#d6d6d6
| 163674 ||  || — || December 3, 2002 || Palomar || NEAT || — || align=right | 5.6 km || 
|-id=675 bgcolor=#d6d6d6
| 163675 ||  || — || December 6, 2002 || Socorro || LINEAR || HYG || align=right | 5.5 km || 
|-id=676 bgcolor=#d6d6d6
| 163676 ||  || — || December 11, 2002 || Socorro || LINEAR || — || align=right | 5.5 km || 
|-id=677 bgcolor=#d6d6d6
| 163677 ||  || — || December 11, 2002 || Socorro || LINEAR || — || align=right | 5.3 km || 
|-id=678 bgcolor=#fefefe
| 163678 ||  || — || December 12, 2002 || Socorro || LINEAR || H || align=right data-sort-value="0.80" | 800 m || 
|-id=679 bgcolor=#FFC2E0
| 163679 ||  || — || December 14, 2002 || Socorro || LINEAR || APO || align=right data-sort-value="0.51" | 510 m || 
|-id=680 bgcolor=#d6d6d6
| 163680 ||  || — || December 14, 2002 || Socorro || LINEAR || Tj (2.99) || align=right | 10 km || 
|-id=681 bgcolor=#d6d6d6
| 163681 ||  || — || December 5, 2002 || Socorro || LINEAR || THM || align=right | 3.5 km || 
|-id=682 bgcolor=#d6d6d6
| 163682 ||  || — || December 6, 2002 || Socorro || LINEAR || EOS || align=right | 3.3 km || 
|-id=683 bgcolor=#FFC2E0
| 163683 ||  || — || December 28, 2002 || Socorro || LINEAR || APOPHA || align=right data-sort-value="0.56" | 560 m || 
|-id=684 bgcolor=#d6d6d6
| 163684 ||  || — || December 31, 2002 || Socorro || LINEAR || — || align=right | 5.8 km || 
|-id=685 bgcolor=#d6d6d6
| 163685 ||  || — || December 31, 2002 || Anderson Mesa || LONEOS || — || align=right | 4.8 km || 
|-id=686 bgcolor=#fefefe
| 163686 ||  || — || January 5, 2003 || Socorro || LINEAR || NYS || align=right | 2.7 km || 
|-id=687 bgcolor=#d6d6d6
| 163687 ||  || — || January 7, 2003 || Socorro || LINEAR || — || align=right | 4.6 km || 
|-id=688 bgcolor=#d6d6d6
| 163688 ||  || — || January 7, 2003 || Socorro || LINEAR || LIX || align=right | 6.3 km || 
|-id=689 bgcolor=#d6d6d6
| 163689 ||  || — || January 25, 2003 || Palomar || NEAT || — || align=right | 4.4 km || 
|-id=690 bgcolor=#fefefe
| 163690 ||  || — || January 25, 2003 || Palomar || NEAT || H || align=right | 1.1 km || 
|-id=691 bgcolor=#FFC2E0
| 163691 ||  || — || January 28, 2003 || Socorro || LINEAR || AMO +1km || align=right | 3.4 km || 
|-id=692 bgcolor=#FFC2E0
| 163692 ||  || — || February 9, 2003 || Haleakala || NEAT || APO +1km || align=right data-sort-value="0.83" | 830 m || 
|-id=693 bgcolor=#FFC2E0
| 163693 Atira ||  ||  || February 11, 2003 || Socorro || LINEAR || ATI +1kmmoon || align=right | 2.0 km || 
|-id=694 bgcolor=#FFC2E0
| 163694 ||  || — || February 27, 2003 || Haleakala || NEAT || AMO +1km || align=right data-sort-value="0.83" | 830 m || 
|-id=695 bgcolor=#d6d6d6
| 163695 ||  || — || March 6, 2003 || Anderson Mesa || LONEOS || HYG || align=right | 4.4 km || 
|-id=696 bgcolor=#FFC2E0
| 163696 ||  || — || March 10, 2003 || Anderson Mesa || LONEOS || APO +1km || align=right | 1.8 km || 
|-id=697 bgcolor=#FFC2E0
| 163697 ||  || — || March 12, 2003 || Socorro || LINEAR || APOPHAcritical || align=right data-sort-value="0.36" | 360 m || 
|-id=698 bgcolor=#fefefe
| 163698 ||  || — || March 7, 2003 || Kitt Peak || Spacewatch || — || align=right | 1.7 km || 
|-id=699 bgcolor=#fefefe
| 163699 ||  || — || March 22, 2003 || Haleakala || NEAT || — || align=right | 2.4 km || 
|-id=700 bgcolor=#fefefe
| 163700 ||  || — || March 24, 2003 || Haleakala || NEAT || FLO || align=right | 1.8 km || 
|}

163701–163800 

|-bgcolor=#fefefe
| 163701 ||  || — || March 25, 2003 || Haleakala || NEAT || — || align=right | 1.4 km || 
|-id=702 bgcolor=#C2FFFF
| 163702 ||  || — || March 26, 2003 || Palomar || NEAT || L4 || align=right | 15 km || 
|-id=703 bgcolor=#fefefe
| 163703 ||  || — || March 27, 2003 || Palomar || NEAT || FLO || align=right | 1.4 km || 
|-id=704 bgcolor=#fefefe
| 163704 ||  || — || March 31, 2003 || Anderson Mesa || LONEOS || FLO || align=right | 1.2 km || 
|-id=705 bgcolor=#fefefe
| 163705 ||  || — || March 30, 2003 || Socorro || LINEAR || — || align=right | 1.5 km || 
|-id=706 bgcolor=#fefefe
| 163706 ||  || — || March 29, 2003 || Anderson Mesa || LONEOS || ERI || align=right | 1.4 km || 
|-id=707 bgcolor=#fefefe
| 163707 ||  || — || March 31, 2003 || Socorro || LINEAR || FLO || align=right data-sort-value="0.95" | 950 m || 
|-id=708 bgcolor=#fefefe
| 163708 ||  || — || March 24, 2003 || Kitt Peak || Spacewatch || — || align=right | 1.4 km || 
|-id=709 bgcolor=#fefefe
| 163709 ||  || — || March 26, 2003 || Anderson Mesa || LONEOS || — || align=right | 1.3 km || 
|-id=710 bgcolor=#fefefe
| 163710 ||  || — || April 1, 2003 || Socorro || LINEAR || NYS || align=right data-sort-value="0.93" | 930 m || 
|-id=711 bgcolor=#fefefe
| 163711 ||  || — || April 2, 2003 || Socorro || LINEAR || — || align=right | 1.3 km || 
|-id=712 bgcolor=#fefefe
| 163712 ||  || — || April 1, 2003 || Socorro || LINEAR || — || align=right data-sort-value="0.77" | 770 m || 
|-id=713 bgcolor=#fefefe
| 163713 ||  || — || April 2, 2003 || Haleakala || NEAT || — || align=right | 1.5 km || 
|-id=714 bgcolor=#fefefe
| 163714 ||  || — || April 5, 2003 || Kitt Peak || Spacewatch || FLO || align=right | 1.2 km || 
|-id=715 bgcolor=#fefefe
| 163715 ||  || — || April 21, 2003 || Catalina || CSS || — || align=right | 1.6 km || 
|-id=716 bgcolor=#fefefe
| 163716 ||  || — || April 24, 2003 || Anderson Mesa || LONEOS || V || align=right | 1.2 km || 
|-id=717 bgcolor=#fefefe
| 163717 ||  || — || April 24, 2003 || Anderson Mesa || LONEOS || V || align=right | 1.0 km || 
|-id=718 bgcolor=#fefefe
| 163718 ||  || — || April 26, 2003 || Kitt Peak || Spacewatch || — || align=right | 1.3 km || 
|-id=719 bgcolor=#fefefe
| 163719 ||  || — || April 26, 2003 || Kitt Peak || Spacewatch || FLO || align=right | 1.3 km || 
|-id=720 bgcolor=#fefefe
| 163720 ||  || — || April 25, 2003 || Kitt Peak || Spacewatch || FLO || align=right data-sort-value="0.91" | 910 m || 
|-id=721 bgcolor=#fefefe
| 163721 ||  || — || April 25, 2003 || Kitt Peak || Spacewatch || — || align=right | 1.2 km || 
|-id=722 bgcolor=#fefefe
| 163722 ||  || — || April 28, 2003 || Socorro || LINEAR || FLO || align=right | 1.1 km || 
|-id=723 bgcolor=#fefefe
| 163723 ||  || — || April 29, 2003 || Socorro || LINEAR || — || align=right | 1.3 km || 
|-id=724 bgcolor=#fefefe
| 163724 ||  || — || April 30, 2003 || Socorro || LINEAR || — || align=right | 1.6 km || 
|-id=725 bgcolor=#fefefe
| 163725 ||  || — || April 30, 2003 || Haleakala || NEAT || FLO || align=right | 1.1 km || 
|-id=726 bgcolor=#fefefe
| 163726 ||  || — || April 24, 2003 || Campo Imperatore || CINEOS || V || align=right | 1.3 km || 
|-id=727 bgcolor=#fefefe
| 163727 ||  || — || May 1, 2003 || Haleakala || NEAT || V || align=right data-sort-value="0.98" | 980 m || 
|-id=728 bgcolor=#fefefe
| 163728 ||  || — || May 2, 2003 || Kitt Peak || Spacewatch || — || align=right | 1.2 km || 
|-id=729 bgcolor=#fefefe
| 163729 ||  || — || May 2, 2003 || Socorro || LINEAR || FLO || align=right data-sort-value="0.84" | 840 m || 
|-id=730 bgcolor=#fefefe
| 163730 ||  || — || May 6, 2003 || Kitt Peak || Spacewatch || FLO || align=right | 1.1 km || 
|-id=731 bgcolor=#C2FFFF
| 163731 || 2003 KD || — || May 20, 2003 || Tenagra II || M. Schwartz, P. R. Holvorcem || L4 || align=right | 17 km || 
|-id=732 bgcolor=#FFC2E0
| 163732 ||  || — || May 22, 2003 || Socorro || LINEAR || APO +1kmslow || align=right | 2.9 km || 
|-id=733 bgcolor=#fefefe
| 163733 ||  || — || May 20, 2003 || Tenagra II || M. Schwartz, P. R. Holvorcem || V || align=right data-sort-value="0.96" | 960 m || 
|-id=734 bgcolor=#fefefe
| 163734 ||  || — || May 25, 2003 || Kitt Peak || Spacewatch || EUT || align=right data-sort-value="0.95" | 950 m || 
|-id=735 bgcolor=#fefefe
| 163735 ||  || — || May 25, 2003 || Kitt Peak || Spacewatch || V || align=right data-sort-value="0.93" | 930 m || 
|-id=736 bgcolor=#fefefe
| 163736 ||  || — || May 26, 2003 || Kitt Peak || Spacewatch || NYS || align=right data-sort-value="0.89" | 890 m || 
|-id=737 bgcolor=#fefefe
| 163737 ||  || — || May 26, 2003 || Haleakala || NEAT || NYS || align=right | 1.1 km || 
|-id=738 bgcolor=#fefefe
| 163738 ||  || — || May 27, 2003 || Haleakala || NEAT || — || align=right | 1.4 km || 
|-id=739 bgcolor=#fefefe
| 163739 ||  || — || May 30, 2003 || Socorro || LINEAR || — || align=right | 1.2 km || 
|-id=740 bgcolor=#fefefe
| 163740 ||  || — || June 1, 2003 || Reedy Creek || J. Broughton || FLO || align=right | 1.1 km || 
|-id=741 bgcolor=#fefefe
| 163741 ||  || — || June 1, 2003 || Reedy Creek || J. Broughton || NYS || align=right | 2.6 km || 
|-id=742 bgcolor=#E9E9E9
| 163742 || 2003 MQ || — || June 21, 2003 || Socorro || LINEAR || — || align=right | 7.4 km || 
|-id=743 bgcolor=#fefefe
| 163743 ||  || — || June 25, 2003 || Socorro || LINEAR || — || align=right | 1.3 km || 
|-id=744 bgcolor=#fefefe
| 163744 ||  || — || June 26, 2003 || Reedy Creek || J. Broughton || NYS || align=right | 1.2 km || 
|-id=745 bgcolor=#fefefe
| 163745 ||  || — || June 28, 2003 || Socorro || LINEAR || — || align=right | 2.2 km || 
|-id=746 bgcolor=#fefefe
| 163746 ||  || — || June 25, 2003 || Socorro || LINEAR || NYS || align=right | 1.3 km || 
|-id=747 bgcolor=#fefefe
| 163747 ||  || — || July 2, 2003 || Socorro || LINEAR || NYS || align=right | 1.5 km || 
|-id=748 bgcolor=#fefefe
| 163748 ||  || — || July 3, 2003 || Reedy Creek || J. Broughton || FLO || align=right | 1.2 km || 
|-id=749 bgcolor=#fefefe
| 163749 ||  || — || July 9, 2003 || Campo Imperatore || CINEOS || NYS || align=right | 1.4 km || 
|-id=750 bgcolor=#fefefe
| 163750 ||  || — || July 2, 2003 || Socorro || LINEAR || V || align=right | 1.4 km || 
|-id=751 bgcolor=#fefefe
| 163751 || 2003 OQ || — || July 20, 2003 || Reedy Creek || J. Broughton || NYS || align=right | 1.4 km || 
|-id=752 bgcolor=#fefefe
| 163752 ||  || — || July 22, 2003 || Socorro || LINEAR || PHO || align=right | 2.3 km || 
|-id=753 bgcolor=#fefefe
| 163753 ||  || — || July 22, 2003 || Haleakala || NEAT || NYS || align=right | 1.2 km || 
|-id=754 bgcolor=#fefefe
| 163754 ||  || — || July 21, 2003 || Campo Imperatore || CINEOS || — || align=right | 1.2 km || 
|-id=755 bgcolor=#fefefe
| 163755 ||  || — || July 22, 2003 || Haleakala || NEAT || MAS || align=right | 1.2 km || 
|-id=756 bgcolor=#fefefe
| 163756 ||  || — || July 25, 2003 || Palomar || NEAT || — || align=right | 1.5 km || 
|-id=757 bgcolor=#fefefe
| 163757 ||  || — || July 23, 2003 || Palomar || NEAT || — || align=right | 2.0 km || 
|-id=758 bgcolor=#FFC2E0
| 163758 ||  || — || July 29, 2003 || Socorro || LINEAR || APO +1km || align=right | 1.2 km || 
|-id=759 bgcolor=#fefefe
| 163759 ||  || — || July 25, 2003 || Socorro || LINEAR || — || align=right | 1.6 km || 
|-id=760 bgcolor=#FFC2E0
| 163760 ||  || — || July 22, 2003 || Palomar || NEAT || AMO +1km || align=right | 2.3 km || 
|-id=761 bgcolor=#fefefe
| 163761 ||  || — || July 22, 2003 || Palomar || NEAT || — || align=right | 1.6 km || 
|-id=762 bgcolor=#E9E9E9
| 163762 ||  || — || July 25, 2003 || Wise || D. Polishook || — || align=right | 3.3 km || 
|-id=763 bgcolor=#E9E9E9
| 163763 ||  || — || July 30, 2003 || Socorro || LINEAR || — || align=right | 2.8 km || 
|-id=764 bgcolor=#fefefe
| 163764 ||  || — || July 24, 2003 || Palomar || NEAT || V || align=right | 1.5 km || 
|-id=765 bgcolor=#fefefe
| 163765 ||  || — || July 24, 2003 || Palomar || NEAT || NYS || align=right | 1.3 km || 
|-id=766 bgcolor=#E9E9E9
| 163766 ||  || — || July 24, 2003 || Palomar || NEAT || — || align=right | 1.6 km || 
|-id=767 bgcolor=#fefefe
| 163767 ||  || — || August 2, 2003 || Haleakala || NEAT || — || align=right | 1.5 km || 
|-id=768 bgcolor=#fefefe
| 163768 ||  || — || August 2, 2003 || Haleakala || NEAT || — || align=right | 1.6 km || 
|-id=769 bgcolor=#fefefe
| 163769 ||  || — || August 2, 2003 || Haleakala || NEAT || V || align=right | 1.4 km || 
|-id=770 bgcolor=#fefefe
| 163770 ||  || — || August 3, 2003 || Haleakala || NEAT || — || align=right | 1.6 km || 
|-id=771 bgcolor=#fefefe
| 163771 ||  || — || August 4, 2003 || Socorro || LINEAR || NYS || align=right | 1.2 km || 
|-id=772 bgcolor=#fefefe
| 163772 ||  || — || August 2, 2003 || Haleakala || NEAT || NYS || align=right | 1.5 km || 
|-id=773 bgcolor=#E9E9E9
| 163773 ||  || — || August 19, 2003 || Campo Imperatore || CINEOS || — || align=right | 1.2 km || 
|-id=774 bgcolor=#fefefe
| 163774 ||  || — || August 18, 2003 || Haleakala || NEAT || NYS || align=right | 1.4 km || 
|-id=775 bgcolor=#fefefe
| 163775 ||  || — || August 20, 2003 || Črni Vrh || Črni Vrh || — || align=right | 1.4 km || 
|-id=776 bgcolor=#E9E9E9
| 163776 ||  || — || August 20, 2003 || Campo Imperatore || CINEOS || — || align=right | 3.1 km || 
|-id=777 bgcolor=#fefefe
| 163777 ||  || — || August 22, 2003 || Haleakala || NEAT || — || align=right | 2.9 km || 
|-id=778 bgcolor=#E9E9E9
| 163778 ||  || — || August 21, 2003 || Campo Imperatore || CINEOS || — || align=right | 1.4 km || 
|-id=779 bgcolor=#E9E9E9
| 163779 ||  || — || August 22, 2003 || Palomar || NEAT || — || align=right | 2.9 km || 
|-id=780 bgcolor=#E9E9E9
| 163780 ||  || — || August 22, 2003 || Palomar || NEAT || — || align=right | 2.0 km || 
|-id=781 bgcolor=#fefefe
| 163781 ||  || — || August 20, 2003 || Palomar || NEAT || — || align=right | 3.4 km || 
|-id=782 bgcolor=#E9E9E9
| 163782 ||  || — || August 22, 2003 || Haleakala || NEAT || JUN || align=right | 2.1 km || 
|-id=783 bgcolor=#E9E9E9
| 163783 ||  || — || August 22, 2003 || Palomar || NEAT || — || align=right | 1.3 km || 
|-id=784 bgcolor=#fefefe
| 163784 ||  || — || August 22, 2003 || Socorro || LINEAR || MAS || align=right | 1.5 km || 
|-id=785 bgcolor=#fefefe
| 163785 ||  || — || August 22, 2003 || Palomar || NEAT || — || align=right | 1.4 km || 
|-id=786 bgcolor=#fefefe
| 163786 ||  || — || August 22, 2003 || Socorro || LINEAR || MAS || align=right | 1.3 km || 
|-id=787 bgcolor=#fefefe
| 163787 ||  || — || August 22, 2003 || Palomar || NEAT || NYS || align=right | 1.3 km || 
|-id=788 bgcolor=#E9E9E9
| 163788 ||  || — || August 22, 2003 || Socorro || LINEAR || EUN || align=right | 2.2 km || 
|-id=789 bgcolor=#E9E9E9
| 163789 ||  || — || August 22, 2003 || Palomar || NEAT || — || align=right | 4.5 km || 
|-id=790 bgcolor=#E9E9E9
| 163790 ||  || — || August 22, 2003 || Palomar || NEAT || — || align=right | 1.2 km || 
|-id=791 bgcolor=#fefefe
| 163791 ||  || — || August 23, 2003 || Socorro || LINEAR || NYS || align=right | 1.2 km || 
|-id=792 bgcolor=#fefefe
| 163792 ||  || — || August 23, 2003 || Socorro || LINEAR || NYS || align=right | 1.4 km || 
|-id=793 bgcolor=#E9E9E9
| 163793 ||  || — || August 22, 2003 || Haleakala || NEAT || — || align=right | 3.5 km || 
|-id=794 bgcolor=#fefefe
| 163794 ||  || — || August 23, 2003 || Socorro || LINEAR || — || align=right | 1.9 km || 
|-id=795 bgcolor=#E9E9E9
| 163795 ||  || — || August 23, 2003 || Socorro || LINEAR || — || align=right | 1.8 km || 
|-id=796 bgcolor=#E9E9E9
| 163796 ||  || — || August 23, 2003 || Palomar || NEAT || — || align=right | 1.5 km || 
|-id=797 bgcolor=#E9E9E9
| 163797 ||  || — || August 23, 2003 || Socorro || LINEAR || — || align=right | 2.9 km || 
|-id=798 bgcolor=#E9E9E9
| 163798 ||  || — || August 23, 2003 || Socorro || LINEAR || — || align=right | 2.9 km || 
|-id=799 bgcolor=#FA8072
| 163799 ||  || — || August 24, 2003 || Socorro || LINEAR || — || align=right | 1.9 km || 
|-id=800 bgcolor=#E9E9E9
| 163800 Richardnorton ||  ||  || August 26, 2003 || Drebach || A. Knöfel || — || align=right | 2.3 km || 
|}

163801–163900 

|-bgcolor=#fefefe
| 163801 ||  || — || August 26, 2003 || Črni Vrh || H. Mikuž || — || align=right | 1.2 km || 
|-id=802 bgcolor=#fefefe
| 163802 ||  || — || August 24, 2003 || Socorro || LINEAR || — || align=right | 1.4 km || 
|-id=803 bgcolor=#E9E9E9
| 163803 ||  || — || August 26, 2003 || Socorro || LINEAR || — || align=right | 5.7 km || 
|-id=804 bgcolor=#E9E9E9
| 163804 ||  || — || August 25, 2003 || Socorro || LINEAR || — || align=right | 3.1 km || 
|-id=805 bgcolor=#E9E9E9
| 163805 ||  || — || August 27, 2003 || Palomar || NEAT || — || align=right | 2.0 km || 
|-id=806 bgcolor=#fefefe
| 163806 ||  || — || August 28, 2003 || Haleakala || NEAT || — || align=right | 3.7 km || 
|-id=807 bgcolor=#E9E9E9
| 163807 ||  || — || August 28, 2003 || Palomar || NEAT || — || align=right | 2.3 km || 
|-id=808 bgcolor=#E9E9E9
| 163808 ||  || — || August 31, 2003 || Haleakala || NEAT || — || align=right | 3.8 km || 
|-id=809 bgcolor=#E9E9E9
| 163809 ||  || — || August 31, 2003 || Haleakala || NEAT || JUN || align=right | 2.2 km || 
|-id=810 bgcolor=#fefefe
| 163810 ||  || — || August 31, 2003 || Haleakala || NEAT || — || align=right | 1.6 km || 
|-id=811 bgcolor=#E9E9E9
| 163811 ||  || — || August 21, 2003 || Socorro || LINEAR || MAR || align=right | 3.2 km || 
|-id=812 bgcolor=#E9E9E9
| 163812 ||  || — || September 2, 2003 || Reedy Creek || J. Broughton || — || align=right | 1.8 km || 
|-id=813 bgcolor=#E9E9E9
| 163813 ||  || — || September 2, 2003 || Socorro || LINEAR || — || align=right | 3.6 km || 
|-id=814 bgcolor=#E9E9E9
| 163814 ||  || — || September 3, 2003 || Haleakala || NEAT || JUN || align=right | 1.9 km || 
|-id=815 bgcolor=#E9E9E9
| 163815 ||  || — || September 1, 2003 || Socorro || LINEAR || EUN || align=right | 1.9 km || 
|-id=816 bgcolor=#E9E9E9
| 163816 ||  || — || September 1, 2003 || Socorro || LINEAR || — || align=right | 4.4 km || 
|-id=817 bgcolor=#E9E9E9
| 163817 ||  || — || September 3, 2003 || Socorro || LINEAR || — || align=right | 3.4 km || 
|-id=818 bgcolor=#FFC2E0
| 163818 ||  || — || September 6, 2003 || Anderson Mesa || LONEOS || APOPHA || align=right data-sort-value="0.39" | 390 m || 
|-id=819 bgcolor=#E9E9E9
| 163819 Teleki ||  ||  || September 7, 2003 || Piszkéstető || K. Sárneczky, B. Sipőcz || — || align=right | 1.2 km || 
|-id=820 bgcolor=#E9E9E9
| 163820 ||  || — || September 7, 2003 || Socorro || LINEAR || — || align=right | 2.4 km || 
|-id=821 bgcolor=#fefefe
| 163821 ||  || — || September 13, 2003 || Anderson Mesa || LONEOS || — || align=right | 1.6 km || 
|-id=822 bgcolor=#E9E9E9
| 163822 ||  || — || September 14, 2003 || Haleakala || NEAT || — || align=right | 1.8 km || 
|-id=823 bgcolor=#E9E9E9
| 163823 ||  || — || September 15, 2003 || Anderson Mesa || LONEOS || — || align=right | 1.3 km || 
|-id=824 bgcolor=#E9E9E9
| 163824 ||  || — || September 16, 2003 || Kitt Peak || Spacewatch || — || align=right | 1.4 km || 
|-id=825 bgcolor=#E9E9E9
| 163825 ||  || — || September 16, 2003 || Kitt Peak || Spacewatch || — || align=right | 3.1 km || 
|-id=826 bgcolor=#E9E9E9
| 163826 ||  || — || September 16, 2003 || Haleakala || NEAT || — || align=right | 5.6 km || 
|-id=827 bgcolor=#E9E9E9
| 163827 ||  || — || September 16, 2003 || Kitt Peak || Spacewatch || — || align=right | 1.5 km || 
|-id=828 bgcolor=#E9E9E9
| 163828 ||  || — || September 16, 2003 || Socorro || LINEAR || — || align=right | 2.1 km || 
|-id=829 bgcolor=#E9E9E9
| 163829 ||  || — || September 16, 2003 || Socorro || LINEAR || EUN || align=right | 2.1 km || 
|-id=830 bgcolor=#E9E9E9
| 163830 ||  || — || September 17, 2003 || Haleakala || NEAT || — || align=right | 1.4 km || 
|-id=831 bgcolor=#fefefe
| 163831 ||  || — || September 18, 2003 || Socorro || LINEAR || V || align=right | 1.2 km || 
|-id=832 bgcolor=#fefefe
| 163832 ||  || — || September 18, 2003 || Socorro || LINEAR || — || align=right | 1.3 km || 
|-id=833 bgcolor=#E9E9E9
| 163833 ||  || — || September 18, 2003 || Palomar || NEAT || HEN || align=right | 1.4 km || 
|-id=834 bgcolor=#E9E9E9
| 163834 ||  || — || September 17, 2003 || Kitt Peak || Spacewatch || EUN || align=right | 2.2 km || 
|-id=835 bgcolor=#E9E9E9
| 163835 ||  || — || September 17, 2003 || Palomar || NEAT || — || align=right | 2.7 km || 
|-id=836 bgcolor=#fefefe
| 163836 ||  || — || September 17, 2003 || Palomar || NEAT || — || align=right | 1.6 km || 
|-id=837 bgcolor=#E9E9E9
| 163837 ||  || — || September 17, 2003 || Palomar || NEAT || — || align=right | 1.3 km || 
|-id=838 bgcolor=#E9E9E9
| 163838 ||  || — || September 16, 2003 || Palomar || NEAT || — || align=right | 1.4 km || 
|-id=839 bgcolor=#fefefe
| 163839 ||  || — || September 16, 2003 || Anderson Mesa || LONEOS || — || align=right | 1.6 km || 
|-id=840 bgcolor=#E9E9E9
| 163840 ||  || — || September 16, 2003 || Anderson Mesa || LONEOS || EUN || align=right | 4.1 km || 
|-id=841 bgcolor=#E9E9E9
| 163841 ||  || — || September 18, 2003 || Palomar || NEAT || — || align=right | 1.4 km || 
|-id=842 bgcolor=#E9E9E9
| 163842 ||  || — || September 16, 2003 || Anderson Mesa || LONEOS || — || align=right | 2.6 km || 
|-id=843 bgcolor=#E9E9E9
| 163843 ||  || — || September 16, 2003 || Kitt Peak || Spacewatch || — || align=right | 2.2 km || 
|-id=844 bgcolor=#fefefe
| 163844 ||  || — || September 16, 2003 || Kitt Peak || Spacewatch || NYS || align=right | 1.3 km || 
|-id=845 bgcolor=#E9E9E9
| 163845 ||  || — || September 17, 2003 || Kitt Peak || Spacewatch || — || align=right | 3.3 km || 
|-id=846 bgcolor=#E9E9E9
| 163846 ||  || — || September 17, 2003 || Campo Imperatore || CINEOS || — || align=right | 4.5 km || 
|-id=847 bgcolor=#E9E9E9
| 163847 ||  || — || September 18, 2003 || Campo Imperatore || CINEOS || — || align=right | 1.2 km || 
|-id=848 bgcolor=#E9E9E9
| 163848 ||  || — || September 18, 2003 || Socorro || LINEAR || — || align=right | 1.5 km || 
|-id=849 bgcolor=#E9E9E9
| 163849 ||  || — || September 17, 2003 || Kitt Peak || Spacewatch || — || align=right | 2.8 km || 
|-id=850 bgcolor=#E9E9E9
| 163850 ||  || — || September 19, 2003 || Kitt Peak || Spacewatch || — || align=right | 1.8 km || 
|-id=851 bgcolor=#E9E9E9
| 163851 ||  || — || September 19, 2003 || Kitt Peak || Spacewatch || — || align=right | 2.1 km || 
|-id=852 bgcolor=#E9E9E9
| 163852 ||  || — || September 16, 2003 || Anderson Mesa || LONEOS || — || align=right | 3.1 km || 
|-id=853 bgcolor=#E9E9E9
| 163853 ||  || — || September 18, 2003 || Kitt Peak || Spacewatch || — || align=right data-sort-value="0.86" | 860 m || 
|-id=854 bgcolor=#E9E9E9
| 163854 ||  || — || September 18, 2003 || Palomar || NEAT || HEN || align=right | 1.3 km || 
|-id=855 bgcolor=#E9E9E9
| 163855 ||  || — || September 17, 2003 || Socorro || LINEAR || — || align=right | 1.4 km || 
|-id=856 bgcolor=#fefefe
| 163856 ||  || — || September 18, 2003 || Socorro || LINEAR || V || align=right | 1.5 km || 
|-id=857 bgcolor=#E9E9E9
| 163857 ||  || — || September 18, 2003 || Palomar || NEAT || — || align=right | 2.8 km || 
|-id=858 bgcolor=#E9E9E9
| 163858 ||  || — || September 18, 2003 || Kitt Peak || Spacewatch || — || align=right | 3.0 km || 
|-id=859 bgcolor=#E9E9E9
| 163859 ||  || — || September 19, 2003 || Palomar || NEAT || MAR || align=right | 2.2 km || 
|-id=860 bgcolor=#E9E9E9
| 163860 ||  || — || September 19, 2003 || Palomar || NEAT || GEF || align=right | 3.4 km || 
|-id=861 bgcolor=#E9E9E9
| 163861 ||  || — || September 19, 2003 || Socorro || LINEAR || — || align=right | 4.1 km || 
|-id=862 bgcolor=#E9E9E9
| 163862 ||  || — || September 19, 2003 || Haleakala || NEAT || — || align=right | 5.5 km || 
|-id=863 bgcolor=#E9E9E9
| 163863 ||  || — || September 20, 2003 || Palomar || NEAT || GEF || align=right | 2.3 km || 
|-id=864 bgcolor=#E9E9E9
| 163864 ||  || — || September 20, 2003 || Socorro || LINEAR || EUN || align=right | 1.9 km || 
|-id=865 bgcolor=#E9E9E9
| 163865 ||  || — || September 20, 2003 || Palomar || NEAT || GER || align=right | 2.0 km || 
|-id=866 bgcolor=#E9E9E9
| 163866 ||  || — || September 20, 2003 || Haleakala || NEAT || — || align=right | 3.6 km || 
|-id=867 bgcolor=#E9E9E9
| 163867 ||  || — || September 19, 2003 || Kitt Peak || Spacewatch || — || align=right | 2.1 km || 
|-id=868 bgcolor=#E9E9E9
| 163868 ||  || — || September 18, 2003 || Palomar || NEAT || — || align=right | 3.5 km || 
|-id=869 bgcolor=#E9E9E9
| 163869 ||  || — || September 19, 2003 || Campo Imperatore || CINEOS || — || align=right | 2.0 km || 
|-id=870 bgcolor=#E9E9E9
| 163870 ||  || — || September 20, 2003 || Palomar || NEAT || — || align=right | 2.2 km || 
|-id=871 bgcolor=#E9E9E9
| 163871 ||  || — || September 20, 2003 || Socorro || LINEAR || — || align=right | 4.2 km || 
|-id=872 bgcolor=#E9E9E9
| 163872 ||  || — || September 20, 2003 || Haleakala || NEAT || — || align=right | 3.1 km || 
|-id=873 bgcolor=#E9E9E9
| 163873 ||  || — || September 20, 2003 || Haleakala || NEAT || — || align=right | 3.2 km || 
|-id=874 bgcolor=#E9E9E9
| 163874 ||  || — || September 21, 2003 || Haleakala || NEAT || HNS || align=right | 2.3 km || 
|-id=875 bgcolor=#E9E9E9
| 163875 ||  || — || September 19, 2003 || Campo Imperatore || CINEOS || — || align=right | 1.4 km || 
|-id=876 bgcolor=#E9E9E9
| 163876 ||  || — || September 19, 2003 || Kitt Peak || Spacewatch || HOF || align=right | 4.0 km || 
|-id=877 bgcolor=#E9E9E9
| 163877 ||  || — || September 19, 2003 || Kitt Peak || Spacewatch || — || align=right | 1.9 km || 
|-id=878 bgcolor=#E9E9E9
| 163878 ||  || — || September 19, 2003 || Kitt Peak || Spacewatch || — || align=right | 1.5 km || 
|-id=879 bgcolor=#E9E9E9
| 163879 ||  || — || September 23, 2003 || Haleakala || NEAT || — || align=right | 3.6 km || 
|-id=880 bgcolor=#fefefe
| 163880 ||  || — || September 23, 2003 || Haleakala || NEAT || — || align=right | 1.5 km || 
|-id=881 bgcolor=#fefefe
| 163881 ||  || — || September 23, 2003 || Haleakala || NEAT || NYS || align=right | 1.3 km || 
|-id=882 bgcolor=#E9E9E9
| 163882 ||  || — || September 18, 2003 || Socorro || LINEAR || — || align=right | 1.3 km || 
|-id=883 bgcolor=#E9E9E9
| 163883 ||  || — || September 18, 2003 || Črni Vrh || Črni Vrh || — || align=right | 1.2 km || 
|-id=884 bgcolor=#E9E9E9
| 163884 ||  || — || September 19, 2003 || Socorro || LINEAR || — || align=right | 1.5 km || 
|-id=885 bgcolor=#E9E9E9
| 163885 ||  || — || September 19, 2003 || Kitt Peak || Spacewatch || MAR || align=right | 2.3 km || 
|-id=886 bgcolor=#E9E9E9
| 163886 ||  || — || September 21, 2003 || Haleakala || NEAT || — || align=right | 3.6 km || 
|-id=887 bgcolor=#E9E9E9
| 163887 ||  || — || September 22, 2003 || Kitt Peak || Spacewatch || EUN || align=right | 3.7 km || 
|-id=888 bgcolor=#E9E9E9
| 163888 ||  || — || September 18, 2003 || Kitt Peak || Spacewatch || — || align=right | 2.3 km || 
|-id=889 bgcolor=#E9E9E9
| 163889 ||  || — || September 20, 2003 || Palomar || NEAT || — || align=right | 4.7 km || 
|-id=890 bgcolor=#E9E9E9
| 163890 ||  || — || September 21, 2003 || Anderson Mesa || LONEOS || PAD || align=right | 4.6 km || 
|-id=891 bgcolor=#E9E9E9
| 163891 ||  || — || September 21, 2003 || Anderson Mesa || LONEOS || — || align=right | 4.5 km || 
|-id=892 bgcolor=#E9E9E9
| 163892 ||  || — || September 21, 2003 || Anderson Mesa || LONEOS || — || align=right | 5.4 km || 
|-id=893 bgcolor=#E9E9E9
| 163893 ||  || — || September 26, 2003 || Desert Eagle || W. K. Y. Yeung || — || align=right | 1.3 km || 
|-id=894 bgcolor=#E9E9E9
| 163894 ||  || — || September 22, 2003 || Anderson Mesa || LONEOS || — || align=right | 2.6 km || 
|-id=895 bgcolor=#E9E9E9
| 163895 ||  || — || September 24, 2003 || Haleakala || NEAT || — || align=right | 1.7 km || 
|-id=896 bgcolor=#E9E9E9
| 163896 ||  || — || September 25, 2003 || Haleakala || NEAT || — || align=right | 3.0 km || 
|-id=897 bgcolor=#fefefe
| 163897 ||  || — || September 25, 2003 || Palomar || NEAT || — || align=right | 2.0 km || 
|-id=898 bgcolor=#E9E9E9
| 163898 ||  || — || September 26, 2003 || Socorro || LINEAR || — || align=right | 3.5 km || 
|-id=899 bgcolor=#FFC2E0
| 163899 ||  || — || September 29, 2003 || Anderson Mesa || LONEOS || ATE +1kmPHAslow || align=right data-sort-value="0.79" | 790 m || 
|-id=900 bgcolor=#E9E9E9
| 163900 ||  || — || September 26, 2003 || Desert Eagle || W. K. Y. Yeung || HEN || align=right | 1.7 km || 
|}

163901–164000 

|-bgcolor=#E9E9E9
| 163901 ||  || — || September 27, 2003 || Desert Eagle || W. K. Y. Yeung || — || align=right | 2.1 km || 
|-id=902 bgcolor=#FFC2E0
| 163902 ||  || — || September 30, 2003 || Socorro || LINEAR || AMO +1km || align=right | 1.3 km || 
|-id=903 bgcolor=#E9E9E9
| 163903 ||  || — || September 29, 2003 || Desert Eagle || W. K. Y. Yeung || — || align=right | 2.4 km || 
|-id=904 bgcolor=#E9E9E9
| 163904 ||  || — || September 24, 2003 || Palomar || NEAT || — || align=right | 2.7 km || 
|-id=905 bgcolor=#E9E9E9
| 163905 ||  || — || September 26, 2003 || Socorro || LINEAR || — || align=right | 2.0 km || 
|-id=906 bgcolor=#E9E9E9
| 163906 ||  || — || September 26, 2003 || Socorro || LINEAR || — || align=right | 2.5 km || 
|-id=907 bgcolor=#E9E9E9
| 163907 ||  || — || September 24, 2003 || Palomar || NEAT || — || align=right | 1.5 km || 
|-id=908 bgcolor=#E9E9E9
| 163908 ||  || — || September 25, 2003 || Haleakala || NEAT || — || align=right | 4.1 km || 
|-id=909 bgcolor=#E9E9E9
| 163909 ||  || — || September 26, 2003 || Socorro || LINEAR || — || align=right | 2.4 km || 
|-id=910 bgcolor=#E9E9E9
| 163910 ||  || — || September 27, 2003 || Desert Eagle || W. K. Y. Yeung || — || align=right | 1.3 km || 
|-id=911 bgcolor=#E9E9E9
| 163911 ||  || — || September 27, 2003 || Socorro || LINEAR || — || align=right | 2.2 km || 
|-id=912 bgcolor=#E9E9E9
| 163912 ||  || — || September 26, 2003 || Socorro || LINEAR || — || align=right | 3.0 km || 
|-id=913 bgcolor=#E9E9E9
| 163913 ||  || — || September 26, 2003 || Socorro || LINEAR || — || align=right | 2.7 km || 
|-id=914 bgcolor=#E9E9E9
| 163914 ||  || — || September 26, 2003 || Socorro || LINEAR || — || align=right | 2.3 km || 
|-id=915 bgcolor=#E9E9E9
| 163915 ||  || — || September 26, 2003 || Socorro || LINEAR || — || align=right | 4.3 km || 
|-id=916 bgcolor=#E9E9E9
| 163916 ||  || — || September 26, 2003 || Socorro || LINEAR || — || align=right | 1.7 km || 
|-id=917 bgcolor=#E9E9E9
| 163917 ||  || — || September 26, 2003 || Socorro || LINEAR || — || align=right | 1.9 km || 
|-id=918 bgcolor=#E9E9E9
| 163918 ||  || — || September 26, 2003 || Socorro || LINEAR || RAF || align=right | 1.9 km || 
|-id=919 bgcolor=#E9E9E9
| 163919 ||  || — || September 28, 2003 || Kitt Peak || Spacewatch || — || align=right | 3.4 km || 
|-id=920 bgcolor=#E9E9E9
| 163920 ||  || — || September 27, 2003 || Socorro || LINEAR || — || align=right | 3.6 km || 
|-id=921 bgcolor=#E9E9E9
| 163921 ||  || — || September 30, 2003 || Socorro || LINEAR || RAF || align=right | 1.5 km || 
|-id=922 bgcolor=#E9E9E9
| 163922 ||  || — || September 19, 2003 || Anderson Mesa || LONEOS || — || align=right | 2.4 km || 
|-id=923 bgcolor=#E9E9E9
| 163923 ||  || — || September 26, 2003 || Črni Vrh || Črni Vrh || — || align=right | 4.1 km || 
|-id=924 bgcolor=#E9E9E9
| 163924 ||  || — || September 27, 2003 || Socorro || LINEAR || — || align=right | 1.4 km || 
|-id=925 bgcolor=#E9E9E9
| 163925 ||  || — || September 29, 2003 || Anderson Mesa || LONEOS || — || align=right | 2.3 km || 
|-id=926 bgcolor=#E9E9E9
| 163926 ||  || — || September 29, 2003 || Socorro || LINEAR || MAR || align=right | 2.5 km || 
|-id=927 bgcolor=#E9E9E9
| 163927 ||  || — || September 17, 2003 || Palomar || NEAT || — || align=right | 1.5 km || 
|-id=928 bgcolor=#E9E9E9
| 163928 ||  || — || September 17, 2003 || Palomar || NEAT || — || align=right | 2.5 km || 
|-id=929 bgcolor=#E9E9E9
| 163929 ||  || — || September 30, 2003 || Socorro || LINEAR || — || align=right | 4.5 km || 
|-id=930 bgcolor=#E9E9E9
| 163930 ||  || — || September 29, 2003 || Anderson Mesa || LONEOS || EUN || align=right | 2.9 km || 
|-id=931 bgcolor=#E9E9E9
| 163931 ||  || — || September 27, 2003 || Socorro || LINEAR || — || align=right | 2.4 km || 
|-id=932 bgcolor=#E9E9E9
| 163932 ||  || — || September 28, 2003 || Socorro || LINEAR || — || align=right | 2.3 km || 
|-id=933 bgcolor=#fefefe
| 163933 ||  || — || September 28, 2003 || Socorro || LINEAR || — || align=right | 4.0 km || 
|-id=934 bgcolor=#E9E9E9
| 163934 ||  || — || September 29, 2003 || Socorro || LINEAR || — || align=right | 3.5 km || 
|-id=935 bgcolor=#E9E9E9
| 163935 ||  || — || September 20, 2003 || Campo Imperatore || CINEOS || — || align=right | 2.5 km || 
|-id=936 bgcolor=#E9E9E9
| 163936 ||  || — || October 14, 2003 || Anderson Mesa || LONEOS || — || align=right | 2.0 km || 
|-id=937 bgcolor=#E9E9E9
| 163937 ||  || — || October 14, 2003 || Anderson Mesa || LONEOS || — || align=right | 3.5 km || 
|-id=938 bgcolor=#E9E9E9
| 163938 ||  || — || October 15, 2003 || Palomar || NEAT || NEM || align=right | 3.0 km || 
|-id=939 bgcolor=#E9E9E9
| 163939 ||  || — || October 5, 2003 || Socorro || LINEAR || EUN || align=right | 2.5 km || 
|-id=940 bgcolor=#E9E9E9
| 163940 ||  || — || October 14, 2003 || Palomar || NEAT || — || align=right | 2.3 km || 
|-id=941 bgcolor=#E9E9E9
| 163941 ||  || — || October 5, 2003 || Socorro || LINEAR || AER || align=right | 2.1 km || 
|-id=942 bgcolor=#E9E9E9
| 163942 || 2003 UN || — || October 16, 2003 || Palomar || NEAT || — || align=right | 4.2 km || 
|-id=943 bgcolor=#E9E9E9
| 163943 ||  || — || October 18, 2003 || Socorro || LINEAR || — || align=right | 2.3 km || 
|-id=944 bgcolor=#d6d6d6
| 163944 ||  || — || October 20, 2003 || Nashville || R. Clingan || — || align=right | 3.3 km || 
|-id=945 bgcolor=#E9E9E9
| 163945 ||  || — || October 21, 2003 || Nashville || R. Clingan || — || align=right | 4.4 km || 
|-id=946 bgcolor=#E9E9E9
| 163946 ||  || — || October 16, 2003 || Anderson Mesa || LONEOS || WIT || align=right | 2.2 km || 
|-id=947 bgcolor=#E9E9E9
| 163947 ||  || — || October 16, 2003 || Anderson Mesa || LONEOS || — || align=right | 1.7 km || 
|-id=948 bgcolor=#E9E9E9
| 163948 ||  || — || October 20, 2003 || Kitt Peak || Spacewatch || — || align=right | 2.3 km || 
|-id=949 bgcolor=#E9E9E9
| 163949 ||  || — || October 17, 2003 || Anderson Mesa || LONEOS || — || align=right | 4.4 km || 
|-id=950 bgcolor=#E9E9E9
| 163950 ||  || — || October 23, 2003 || Wrightwood || J. W. Young || MAR || align=right | 2.3 km || 
|-id=951 bgcolor=#E9E9E9
| 163951 ||  || — || October 23, 2003 || Kitt Peak || Spacewatch || — || align=right | 2.8 km || 
|-id=952 bgcolor=#E9E9E9
| 163952 ||  || — || October 19, 2003 || Kitt Peak || Spacewatch || HOF || align=right | 4.8 km || 
|-id=953 bgcolor=#E9E9E9
| 163953 ||  || — || October 16, 2003 || Palomar || NEAT || — || align=right | 3.9 km || 
|-id=954 bgcolor=#E9E9E9
| 163954 ||  || — || October 16, 2003 || Palomar || NEAT || — || align=right | 2.5 km || 
|-id=955 bgcolor=#E9E9E9
| 163955 ||  || — || October 16, 2003 || Anderson Mesa || LONEOS || — || align=right | 4.6 km || 
|-id=956 bgcolor=#E9E9E9
| 163956 ||  || — || October 18, 2003 || Kitt Peak || Spacewatch || AGN || align=right | 2.1 km || 
|-id=957 bgcolor=#E9E9E9
| 163957 ||  || — || October 16, 2003 || Anderson Mesa || LONEOS || — || align=right | 2.0 km || 
|-id=958 bgcolor=#E9E9E9
| 163958 ||  || — || October 24, 2003 || Kingsnake || J. V. McClusky || AER || align=right | 2.3 km || 
|-id=959 bgcolor=#E9E9E9
| 163959 ||  || — || October 16, 2003 || Palomar || NEAT || NEM || align=right | 3.4 km || 
|-id=960 bgcolor=#E9E9E9
| 163960 ||  || — || October 16, 2003 || Anderson Mesa || LONEOS || — || align=right | 4.0 km || 
|-id=961 bgcolor=#E9E9E9
| 163961 ||  || — || October 16, 2003 || Kitt Peak || Spacewatch || — || align=right | 2.3 km || 
|-id=962 bgcolor=#E9E9E9
| 163962 ||  || — || October 17, 2003 || Kitt Peak || Spacewatch || — || align=right | 3.1 km || 
|-id=963 bgcolor=#E9E9E9
| 163963 ||  || — || October 16, 2003 || Kitt Peak || Spacewatch || — || align=right | 2.7 km || 
|-id=964 bgcolor=#E9E9E9
| 163964 ||  || — || October 16, 2003 || Haleakala || NEAT || — || align=right | 2.0 km || 
|-id=965 bgcolor=#E9E9E9
| 163965 ||  || — || October 19, 2003 || Palomar || NEAT || — || align=right | 2.4 km || 
|-id=966 bgcolor=#E9E9E9
| 163966 ||  || — || October 18, 2003 || Palomar || NEAT || — || align=right | 2.7 km || 
|-id=967 bgcolor=#E9E9E9
| 163967 ||  || — || October 19, 2003 || Anderson Mesa || LONEOS || AER || align=right | 2.3 km || 
|-id=968 bgcolor=#E9E9E9
| 163968 ||  || — || October 19, 2003 || Palomar || NEAT || — || align=right | 3.4 km || 
|-id=969 bgcolor=#E9E9E9
| 163969 ||  || — || October 19, 2003 || Palomar || NEAT || — || align=right | 2.1 km || 
|-id=970 bgcolor=#E9E9E9
| 163970 ||  || — || October 20, 2003 || Socorro || LINEAR || — || align=right | 1.6 km || 
|-id=971 bgcolor=#E9E9E9
| 163971 ||  || — || October 20, 2003 || Kitt Peak || Spacewatch || — || align=right | 2.1 km || 
|-id=972 bgcolor=#E9E9E9
| 163972 ||  || — || October 18, 2003 || Kitt Peak || Spacewatch || PAD || align=right | 2.5 km || 
|-id=973 bgcolor=#E9E9E9
| 163973 ||  || — || October 19, 2003 || Kitt Peak || Spacewatch || — || align=right | 2.0 km || 
|-id=974 bgcolor=#E9E9E9
| 163974 ||  || — || October 19, 2003 || Palomar || NEAT || — || align=right | 3.2 km || 
|-id=975 bgcolor=#d6d6d6
| 163975 ||  || — || October 19, 2003 || Kitt Peak || Spacewatch || — || align=right | 2.9 km || 
|-id=976 bgcolor=#E9E9E9
| 163976 ||  || — || October 20, 2003 || Palomar || NEAT || — || align=right | 2.0 km || 
|-id=977 bgcolor=#E9E9E9
| 163977 ||  || — || October 20, 2003 || Socorro || LINEAR || — || align=right | 2.2 km || 
|-id=978 bgcolor=#E9E9E9
| 163978 ||  || — || October 20, 2003 || Palomar || NEAT || AGN || align=right | 2.2 km || 
|-id=979 bgcolor=#E9E9E9
| 163979 ||  || — || October 21, 2003 || Socorro || LINEAR || — || align=right | 2.5 km || 
|-id=980 bgcolor=#E9E9E9
| 163980 ||  || — || October 17, 2003 || Anderson Mesa || LONEOS || — || align=right | 3.6 km || 
|-id=981 bgcolor=#E9E9E9
| 163981 ||  || — || October 18, 2003 || Kitt Peak || Spacewatch || — || align=right | 4.2 km || 
|-id=982 bgcolor=#E9E9E9
| 163982 ||  || — || October 21, 2003 || Kitt Peak || Spacewatch || — || align=right | 3.3 km || 
|-id=983 bgcolor=#E9E9E9
| 163983 ||  || — || October 18, 2003 || Palomar || NEAT || — || align=right | 4.9 km || 
|-id=984 bgcolor=#E9E9E9
| 163984 ||  || — || October 19, 2003 || Anderson Mesa || LONEOS || INO || align=right | 2.9 km || 
|-id=985 bgcolor=#E9E9E9
| 163985 ||  || — || October 20, 2003 || Palomar || NEAT || WIT || align=right | 2.2 km || 
|-id=986 bgcolor=#E9E9E9
| 163986 ||  || — || October 20, 2003 || Palomar || NEAT || — || align=right | 1.8 km || 
|-id=987 bgcolor=#E9E9E9
| 163987 ||  || — || October 21, 2003 || Socorro || LINEAR || — || align=right | 2.6 km || 
|-id=988 bgcolor=#E9E9E9
| 163988 ||  || — || October 18, 2003 || Anderson Mesa || LONEOS || WIT || align=right | 2.2 km || 
|-id=989 bgcolor=#E9E9E9
| 163989 ||  || — || October 18, 2003 || Anderson Mesa || LONEOS || — || align=right | 2.8 km || 
|-id=990 bgcolor=#E9E9E9
| 163990 ||  || — || October 18, 2003 || Anderson Mesa || LONEOS || — || align=right | 4.5 km || 
|-id=991 bgcolor=#E9E9E9
| 163991 ||  || — || October 18, 2003 || Kitt Peak || Spacewatch || — || align=right | 1.8 km || 
|-id=992 bgcolor=#E9E9E9
| 163992 ||  || — || October 18, 2003 || Palomar || NEAT || WIT || align=right | 1.7 km || 
|-id=993 bgcolor=#E9E9E9
| 163993 ||  || — || October 19, 2003 || Kitt Peak || Spacewatch || — || align=right | 4.0 km || 
|-id=994 bgcolor=#E9E9E9
| 163994 ||  || — || October 20, 2003 || Socorro || LINEAR || — || align=right | 2.1 km || 
|-id=995 bgcolor=#E9E9E9
| 163995 ||  || — || October 20, 2003 || Kitt Peak || Spacewatch || — || align=right | 3.2 km || 
|-id=996 bgcolor=#E9E9E9
| 163996 ||  || — || October 21, 2003 || Kitt Peak || Spacewatch || — || align=right | 2.8 km || 
|-id=997 bgcolor=#E9E9E9
| 163997 ||  || — || October 21, 2003 || Socorro || LINEAR || — || align=right | 3.6 km || 
|-id=998 bgcolor=#E9E9E9
| 163998 ||  || — || October 21, 2003 || Socorro || LINEAR || — || align=right | 3.8 km || 
|-id=999 bgcolor=#d6d6d6
| 163999 ||  || — || October 21, 2003 || Kitt Peak || Spacewatch || KOR || align=right | 1.7 km || 
|-id=000 bgcolor=#E9E9E9
| 164000 ||  || — || October 22, 2003 || Socorro || LINEAR || — || align=right | 2.4 km || 
|}

References

External links 
 Discovery Circumstances: Numbered Minor Planets (160001)–(165000) (IAU Minor Planet Center)

0163